List of civil aircraft is a list of articles on civilian aircraft with descriptions, which excludes aircraft operated by military organizations in civil markings, warbirds, warbirds used for racing, replica warbirds and research aircraft.

A

ABC Motors
ABC Robin single-seat cabin monoplane

Abraham
Abraham Iris I & II two-seat parasol monoplane

Abrams
Abrams P-1 Explorer pusher survey aircraft

Ace Aircraft Manufacturing Company
Ace Baby Ace single-seat parasol monoplane ultralight homebuilt
Ace Junior Ace single-seat parasol monoplane ultralight homebuilt
Ace Scooter single-seat parasol monoplane ultralight homebuilt

Acro Sport
Acro Sport I single-seat aerobatic biplane
Acro Sport II two-seat aerobatic biplane
Pober Pixie single-seat parasol monoplane
Pober Super Ace single-seat parasol monoplane

Adam Aircraft Industries
Adam A500 twin piston engined executive passenger aircraft
Adam A700 executive jet

Adcox
Adcox Student Prince two-seat open biplane

Advanced Aerodynamics and Structures Inc.
AASI Jetcruzer turboprop canard pusher

Advanced Vehicle Engineers
AVE Mizar  flying car based on Ford Pinto

Aerial Distributors
Distributor Wing DWI-1 low-wing twin-engine turboprop crop duster

Aero Engineers Australia
AEA Explorer single-engine utility aircraft
AEA Maverick single-seat sportsplane

Aero-Flight
Aero-Flight Streak two-seat low wing monoplane

Aermacchi
(for earlier types see Macchi)
Aermacchi AL-60 utility aircraft
Aermacchi SF.260 two-seat trainer and aerobatics aircraft

Aero AT
Aero AT-1 two-seat low-wing ultralight
Aero AT-2, 3 & 4 two-seat low-wing ultralight

Aero Boero
Aero Boero AB-95/115 three-seat high-wing utility aircraft
Aero Boero AB-150 and AB-180  three-seat high-wing utility aircraft
Aero Boero AB-210 high-wing utility aircraft prototype
Aero Boero 260AG low-wing agricultural aircraft

Aéro Club du Bas Armagnac
ACBA Midour monoplane glider tugs

Aero Commander
Aero Commander 100 four-seat light aircraft
Aero Commander 500/600 series twin-engine business aircraft
Aero Commander Jet Commander business jet

Aero Vodochody
Aero A.10 biplane five-passenger airliner
Aero A.22 biplane two-passenger airliner
Aero A.23 biplane seven-passenger airliner
Aero A.34 Kos two-seat light aircraft
Aero A.35 five-passenger airliner
Aero A.38 eight-passenger airliner
Aero A.200 single-engine low-wing monoplane
Aero A.204 twin-engine monoplane airliner prototype
Aero Ae 45 & Ae 145 twin-engine light aircraft

Aerokopter
Aerokopter AK1-3 Sanka two-seat helicopter

Aeromarine/Aeromarine-Klemm
Aeromarine 50 single-engine biplane flying-boat airliner developed from bomber
Aeromarine 75 twin-engine biplane flying-boat airliner developed from bomber
Aeromarine AM-1 & 2 single-engine biplane mailplane
Aeromarine-Klemm 70 two-seat monoplane

Aeromot
Aeromot AMT-100 Ximango two-seat motor glider
Aeromot AMT-200 Super Ximango two-seat motor glider

Aeronca
Aeronca 6 two-seat high-wing monoplane
Aeronca 7 Champion two-seat high-wing monoplane
Aeronca 9 Arrow two-seat low-wing monoplane
Aeronca 11 Chief two-seat high-wing monoplane
Aeronca 12 Chum two-seat low-wing monoplane (licence-built Ercoupe)
Aeronca 15 Sedan four-seat high-wing monoplane
Aeronca 50 Chief two-seat high-wing monoplane
Aeronca 65 Super Chief two-seat high-wing monoplane
Aeronca C-1 Cadet single-seat monoplane
Aeronca C-2 single-seat monoplane
Aeronca C-3 single-seat monoplane
Aeronca K two-seat high-wing monoplane
Aeronca L low-wing monoplane

Aero Spacelines
Aero Spacelines Pregnant Guppy piston engined oversize-cargo aircraft
Aero Spacelines Super Guppy turboprop oversize-cargo
Aero Spacelines Mini Guppy piston engined oversize-cargo
Aero Spacelines Mini Guppy Turbine turboprop oversize-cargo

Aérospatiale
(see also Eurocopter & SOCATA)
Aérospatiale Alouette II & Lama light utility helicopters
Aérospatiale Alouette III light utility helicopter
Aérospatiale N 262 & Mohawk 298 turboprop airliner
Aérospatiale Puma twin-engine medium-lift helicopter
Aérospatiale Gazelle utility helicopter
Aérospatiale Écureuil & Écureuil 2 light utility helicopter
Aérospatiale Dauphin mid-size utility helicopter
Aérospatiale Corvette business jet
Aérospatiale-British Aerospace Concorde supersonic airliner

Aerostar
Aerostar Festival light sport aircraft

Aetna
Aetna Aerocraft S-2 two-seat open low-wing monoplane

Agusta and AgustaWestland
Agusta A109 utility/corporate helicopter
Agusta A119 Koala utility helicopter
AgustaWestland AW139 medium lift utility helicopter
AgustaWestland AW169 utility helicopter
AgustaWestland AW189 medium-lift helicopter

Ahrens
Ahrens AR 404 four-engine turboprop utility aircraft

Air Tractor
Air Tractor AT-300, 301 and 302 piston & turboprop crop dusters
Air Tractor AT-400, 401 and 402 piston & turboprop crop dusters
Air Tractor AT-500, 501, 502, 503 and 504 piston & turboprop crop dusters
Air Tractor AT-602 turboprop crop duster
Air Tractor AT-802 turboprop crop duster
Air Tractor AT-1002 turboprop crop duster

Aichi
Aichi AB-4 transport/airliner flying boat

Airbus
Airbus A220 short haul jetliner (formerly Bombardier CSeries)
Airbus A300 widebody jetliner
Airbus A310 widebody jetliner
Airbus A318 twin-engine jetliner
Airbus A319 twin-engine jetliner and large corporate jet
Airbus A320 twin-engine jetliner
Airbus A321 twin-engine jetliner
Airbus A330 widebody jetliner
Airbus A340 widebody four-engine jetliner
Airbus A350 widebody jetliner
Airbus A380 four-engine high-capacity widebody jetliner
Airbus Beluga oversize cargo aircraft
Airbus BelugaXL passenger biplane converted from bomber
Airco DH.16 biplane airliner

Aircraft Designs
ADI Bumble Bee ultralight homebuilt autogyro
ADI Condor pusher homebuilt motorglider
ADI Sportster two-seat autogyro
ADI Stallion six-seat homebuilt high-wing monoplane

Airspeed
Airspeed Ambassador twin-engine airliner
Airspeed Consul twin-engine monoplane airliner
Airspeed Courier single-engine cabin monoplane
Airspeed Envoy twin-engine monoplane airliner
Airspeed Ferry trimotor biplane airliner
Airspeed Viceroy twin-engine monoplane racer

Air Creation
Air Creation Racer ultralight
Air Creation GT ultralight
Air Creation Clipper ultralight
Air Creation Tanarg ultralight
Air Creation Trek ultralight
Air Creation Twin ultralight
Air Creation Skypper ultralight

Albatros
Albatros L 58 single-engine monoplane airliner
Albatros L 59 single-seat monoplane sportsplane
Albatros L 60 two-seat monoplane utility/sportsplane
Albatros L 72 single-engine newspaper delivery biplane
Albatros L 73 twin-engined biplane airliner
Albatros L 79 Kobold single-seat aerobatic biplane

Alcor
Alcor C-6-1 Junior twin-engine low-wing airliner
Alcor Duo-4 twin-engine high-wing airliner
Alcor Duo-6 twin-engine high-wing airliner

Aleksandrov-Kalinin
Aleksandrov-Kalinin AK-1 single-engine monoplane airliner

Alexander Aircraft Company
Alexander Bullet four-seat low-wing monoplane
Alexander Eaglerock three-seat utility biplane
Alexander Flyabout D two-seat monoplane

All American
All American Ensign two seat low wing monoplane

Allegro LSA
Allegro 2007 two-seat light sport

Alliance
Alliance A-1 Argo two-seat open biplane

Alon
Alon A-2 Aircoupe two seat monoplane, updated Erco Ercoupe

Alpha
Alpha 2000 Robin R2000 manufactured in New Zealand

American Aviation
American Aviation AA-1 Yankee & Trainer two-seat light aircraft
American Aviation AA-2 Patriot four-seat light aircraft prototype

American Champion
American Champion & Bellanca two-seat utility/aerobatic light aircraft

American Eagle
American Eagle A-101 three-seat open-cockpit sports/utility biplane
American Eagle A-129 three-seat open-cockpit sports/utility biplane
American Eagle Eaglet two-seat high-wing ultralight

American Gyro
American Gyro AG-4 Crusader small twin-engine cabin sportsplane

Anderson
Anderson Kingfisher high-wing monoplane amphibious homebuilt

Anderson Greenwood
Anderson Greenwood AG-14 two-seat pusher utility monoplane

ANEC
ANEC I single-seat ultralight monoplane
ANEC III single engine mailplane and airliner

Angel Aircraft Corporation
AAC Angel twin-engine utility aircraft

Ansaldo
Ansaldo A.300C & T single-engine biplane airliner

Antonov
Antonov An-2 biplane utility transport
Antonov An-10 turboprop transport
Antonov An-12 turboprop cargo aircraft
Antonov An-14 utility transport aircraft
Antonov An-22 Large capacity turboprop cargo aircraft
Antonov An-24 airliner and utility aircraft
Antonov An-28 Regional airliner and utility transport
Antonov An-30 aerial survey aircraft
Antonov An-38 Regional airliner and utility transport
Antonov An-70 heavylift propfan cargo aircraft
Antonov An-72 STOL utility transport
Antonov An-74 STOL utility transport
Antonov An-124 Ruslan heavylift freighter
Antonov An-140 turboprop airliner
Antonov An-148 regional airliner
Antonov An-225 Mriya large cargo aircraft

Antoinette
Antoinette VII sporting monoplane

APM
APM 20 Lionceau light utility aircraft
APM 30 Lion light utility aircraft

Arado
Arado S I & S III two-seat trainers
Arado SC I two-seat trainer
Arado SC II two-seat trainer
Arado L I two-seat light aircraft
Arado L II two-seat light aircraft
Arado V I prototype four passenger airliner and air mail carrier
Arado W 2 two-seat seaplane trainer
Arado Ar 79 two-seat aerobatic trainer and touring monoplane

Arctic Aircraft
Arctic Aircraft Arctic Tern light sportsplane

Argonaut
Argonaut Pirate amphibious monoplane

Armstrong Whitworth
Armstrong Whitworth Argosy three-engine biplane airliner
Armstrong Whitworth Atalanta four-engine monoplane airliner
Armstrong Whitworth Ensign four-engine monoplane airliner
Armstrong Whitworth Apollo four-engine turboprop airliner prototype
Armstrong Whitworth Argosy four-engine turboprop cargo aircraft

Arrow
Arrow Sport two-seat light aircraft
Arrow Model F two-seat low-wing monoplane

Arup
Arup S-2 single-seat flying wing
Arup S-4 two-seat flying wing

Atlantic Aircraft
(Fokker America, for Dutch aircraft see Fokker)
Fokker Universal single-engine monoplane transport
Fokker Super Universal single-engine monoplane transport
Fokker F.10 trimotor high-wing monoplane airliner
Fokker F.11 utility flying boat
Fokker F.14 single-engine parasol monoplane transport
Fokker F.32 four-seat twin-engine low wing monoplane

ATR
ATR 42 turboprop regional airliner
ATR 72 turboprop regional airliner

Auster
Auster J-1 Autocrat three-seat light aircraft
Auster J-1U Workmaster agricultural aircraft
Auster J-2 Arrow two-seat light aircraft
Auster J-3 Atom two-seat light aircraft
Auster J-4 two-seat light aircraft
Auster Avis prototype light utility aircraft
Auster Autocar four-seat light aircraft
Auster Aiglet Trainer aerobatic four-seat light aircraft
Auster Alpine four-seat light aircraft
Auster B.4 prototype light cargo aircraft
Auster Agricola agricultural aircraft
Auster D.4 two-seat light aircraft

Austin
Austin Whippet single-seat sports biplane

Avia
Avia BH-1 two-seat light aircraft
Avia BH-5 two-seat light aircraft
Avia BH-9 two-seat light aircraft
Avia BH-10 single-seat aerobatic aircraft
Avia BH-12 two-seat light aircraft
Avia BH-16 single-seat light aircraft
Avia BH-20 two-seat trainer
Avia BH-25 biplane airliner
Avia 14 turboprop airliner

Aviamilano
Aviamilano A2 Standard  sailplane
Aviamilano CPV1 competition sailplane
 Aviamilano F.250 two-seat aerobatic monoplane
 Aviamilano F.260 two-seat aerobatic monoplane
Aviamilano Falco two-seat aerobatic monoplane
Aviamilano Nibbio four-seat cabin monoplane
Aviamilano Scricciolo two-seat monoplane trainer

Aviat
Aviat Husky two-seat utility light aircraft
Aviat Pitts Special competition aerobatic biplane

Aviation Traders
Aviation Traders Accountant prototype turboprop airliner
Aviation Traders Carvair roll-on roll-off car freighter

Avid
Avid Flyer high-wing monoplane kitplane

Aviméta
Aviméta 132 monoplane trimotor airliner

Avro
Avro G single-engine cabin biplane
Avro 500 sporting biplane
Avro 504 training biplane used for barnstorming
Avro 534 Baby single-seat light aircraft
Avro Avian two-seat light aircraft
Avro 547 single-engine triplane airliner
Avro 560 single-seat ultralight for Lympne trials
Avro 618 Ten ten-passenger trimotor airliner (Fokker F.VII built under licence)
Avro 619 Five five-passenger trimotor airliner
Avro 624 Six six-passenger trimotor airliner
Avro 627 Mailplane single-engine biplane mailplane
Avro 631 Cadet two-seat open sports and training biplane
Avro 638 Club Cadet two-seat open sports and training biplane
Avro 641 Commodore single-engine cabin biplane
Avro 642 Eighteen two or four-engine monoplane airliner
Avro 652 twin-engine airliner
Avro Anson twin-engine airliner
Avro Lancastrian transport converted from Lancaster bomber
Avro York four-engine airliner developed from Lancaster
Avro Tudor four-engine airliner
Avro 748 turboprop airliner a.k.a. HS 748 and BAe 748
Avro RJ Series turbofan airliner, was BAe 146

Avro Canada
Avro Canada Jetliner jet airliner

Avtek
Avtek 400 twin-turboprop canard utility airliner

Ayres
Ayres Let L 610 regional airliner
Ayres Thrush & Rockwell Thrush Commander agricultural aircraft

B

BAC (British Aircraft Company)
British Aircraft Company Drone single-seat ultralight

BAC (British Aircraft Corporation)
Aerospatiale-BAC Concorde supersonic airliner
BAC One-Eleven jetliner

Bach
Bach Air Yacht high-wing monoplane trimotor airliner

BAe
BAe 125 business jet
BAe 146 four-engine regional airliner
BAe ATP twin-engine turboprop airliner
BAe Jetstream twin-turboprop airliner
BAe Jetstream 41 twin-turboprop airliner

Barkley-Grow
Barkley-Grow T8P-1 twin-engine airliner

Barnhart
Barnhart Twin 15 Wampus Kat twin-engine biplane airliner

BAT
BAT F.K.26 single-engine biplane cabin airliner

Bäumer
Bäumer Sausewind open-cockpit two-seat sport monoplane

Beagle Aircraft
Beagle Airedale four-seat high-wing light aircraft
Beagle Husky high-wing light aircraft
Beagle Pup low-wing light aircraft
Beagle Terrier high-wing three-seat light aircraft
Beagle Basset light twin-engine utility aircraft

Beardmore
Beardmore Wee Bee ultralight

Bede
Bede BD-1 two-seat prototype design
Bede BD-4 four-seat homebuilt monoplane
Bede BD-5 single-seat jet or piston-powered sport aircraft

Beechcraft
Beechcraft Model 17 Staggerwing cabin biplane
Beechcraft Model 18 twin-engine utility transport
Beechcraft Model 19 Musketeer four-seat light aircraft
Beechcraft Model 23 Sundowner four-seat light aircraft
Beechcraft Model 24 Sierra four-seat light aircraft
Beechcraft Model 33 Bonanza four/six-seat light aircraft
Beechcraft Model 34 Twin Quad four-engine airliner
Beechcraft Model 35 Bonanza four/six-seat light aircraft
Beechcraft Model 36 Bonanza four/six-seat light aircraft
Beechcraft Model 50 Twin Bonanza six-seat light twin
Beechcraft Model 55 Baron four or six-seat light twin
Beechcraft Model 56 Baron four or six-seat light twin
Beechcraft Model 58 Baron four or six-seat light twin
Beechcraft Model 60 Duke four or six-seat high-performance twin
Beechcraft Model 65 Queen Air
Beechcraft Model 70 Queen Air
Beechcraft Model 76 Duchess four-seat light twin
Beechcraft Model 77 Skipper<1--1978--> two-seat trainer
Beechcraft Model 80 Queen Air 
Beechcraft Model 85 Queen Air 
Beechcraft Model 88 Queen Air utility transport
Beechcraft Model 90 King Air utility transport
Beechcraft Model 95 Travel Air four-seat light twin
Beechcraft Model 99 Airliner commuter airliner
Beechcraft Model 100 King Air utility transport
Beechcraft Model 200 Super King Air utility transport
Beechcraft Model 300 Super King Air utility transport
Beechcraft Model 1300 Airliner commuter airliner
Beechcraft Model 1900 Airliner regional airliner/executive transport
Beechcraft Starship 2000 corporate transport
Hawker 400 Beechjet light corporate jet
Beechcraft 220 Denali Single-turboprop high-performance utility aircraft
Beechcraft Premier Twin-turbofan-engined utility aircraft (entry level jet)

Beecraft
Beecraft Honey Bee single-seat high-wing cabin monoplane
Beecraft Queen Bee four-seat low-wing monoplane
Beecraft Wee Bee monoplane flown from prone position on top of fuselage

Bell Helicopter
Bell 47 three-seat utility helicopter
Bell 204 and 205 (Huey) utility helicopter
Bell 206 JetRanger, LongRanger & Twinranger light utility helicopter
Bell 212 medium lift utility helicopter
Bell 214 medium transport helicopter
Bell 222 & 230 utility helicopters
Bell 407 seven-seat utility helicopter
Bell 412 medium-lift utility helicopter
Bell 427 light utility helicopter
Bell 429 utility helicopter
Bell 430 helicopter
Bell BA 609 corporate/utility tiltrotor

Bellanca
Bellanca CF single-engine four-seat cabin monoplane
Wright-Bellanca WB-2 single-engine cabin transport and distance record aircraft
Bellanca CH-300 Pacemaker single-engine cabin transport
Bellanca CH-400 Skyrocket single-engine cabin transport
Bellanca Aircruiser large single-engine cabin transport
Bellanca 28-70 single-engine racing monoplane
Bellanca 28-92 trimotor racing monoplane
Bellanca 31-40 Senior Pacemaker single-engine cabin transport
Bellanca 31-50 Senior Skyrocket single-engine cabin transport
Bellanca 14-7 single-engine cabin sports monoplane
Bellanca 14-13 single-engine cabin sports monoplane
Bellanca 17-30 Viking single-engine cabin sports monoplane
Bellanca Skyrocket II single-engine 6-seat monoplane

Beneš-Mráz
Beneš-Mráz Be-50 Beta-Minor two-seat open-cockpit sporting monoplane
Beneš-Mráz Be-60 Bestiola two-seat cabin sporting high-wing monoplane
Beneš-Mráz Be-550 Bibi two-seat cabin sporting low-wing monoplane

Beriev
Beriev MP-1 flying boat airliner
Beriev Be-30/Be-32 regional airliner/utility transport
Beriev Be-103 utility amphibian
Beriev Be-200 firefighting and utility amphibian

Bernard
Bernard 18 single-engine monoplane airliner
Bernard 190 single-engine monoplane airliner
Bernard 60 trimotor monoplane airliner
Bernard 200 touring monoplane

BFW
(for later designs see Messerschmitt)
BFW M.17 two-seat ultralight sportsplane
BFW M.18 single-engine high-wing monoplane airliner
BFW M.19 low-wing single-seat sportsplane
BFW M.20 single-engine high-wing monoplane airliner
BFW M.23 two-seat sports monoplane
BFW M.24 single-engine high-wing monoplane airliner
BFW M.27 two-seat sports monoplane
BFW M.29 two-seat sports/racing monoplane
BFW M.35 two-seat sports monoplane

Blackburn
Blackburn Bluebird two-seat open sports utility biplane
Blackburn Kangaroo twin-engine biplane converted into airliner
Blackburn Segrave four-seat twin-engine cabin monoplane
Blackburn Sidecar two-seat 1920s ultralight

Blériot
Blériot XI sportsplane and racing monoplane
Blériot XII passenger airplane
Blériot XXIII racing monoplane
Blériot XXIV Limousine  passenger airplane
Blériot 75 Aerobus four-engine biplane airliner
Blériot 110 single-engine distance record aircraft
Blériot 111 single-engine airliner monoplane
Blériot 115 four-engine biplane airliner
Blériot 125 twin-engine twin fuselage airliner
Blériot 135 four-engine biplane airliner
Blériot 155 four-engine biplane airliner
Blériot 290 single-engine touring amphibian
Blériot 5190 monoplane flying boat mailplane

Blériot-SPAD
Blériot-SPAD S.27 single-engine three-seat airliner
Blériot-SPAD S.29 single-engine sports/trainer biplane
Blériot-SPAD S.33 single-engine biplane airliner
Blériot-SPAD S.45 twin-engine biplane airliner
Blériot-SPAD S.46 single-engine biplane airliner
Blériot-SPAD S.50 single-engine biplane airliner
Blériot-SPAD S.56 single-engine biplane airliner

Bloch
Bloch MB.60 single-engine monoplane airliner
Bloch MB.90 two-seat light aircraft
Bloch MB.120 trimotor monoplane airliner
Bloch MB.160 four-engine airliner developed into the SNCASE Languedoc
Bloch MB.220 twin-engine monoplane airliner
Bloch MB.300 Pacifique twin-engine monoplane airliner

Blohm + Voss
Blohm & Voss Ha 139 four-engine monoplane floatplane mailplane
Blohm & Voss BV 142 four-engine monoplane transatlantic mailplane

Boeing
Boeing B-1 biplane flying boat mailplane
Boeing Model 40 biplane air mail carrier/airliner
Boeing Model 80 biplane airliner
Boeing Model 221 Monomail single-engine monoplane mailplane
Boeing 247 twin-engine low-wing monoplane airliner
Boeing 307 Stratoliner four-engine low-wing monoplane airliner
Boeing 314 Clipper Flying boat airliner
Boeing 367-80 jet airliner development aircraft
Boeing 377 Stratocruiser propeller airliner
Boeing 707 four-jet airliner and freighter
Boeing 717 short- to medium-range airliner
Boeing 720 medium-range four-jet airliner
Boeing 727 short- to medium-range airliner
Boeing 737 short- to medium-range airliner
Boeing 747 long-range high-capacity widebody airliner
Boeing 757 twin-jet airliner
Boeing 767 twin-jet airliner
Boeing 777 long-range widebody airliners
Boeing 787 Dreamliner widebody airliner
Boeing Business Jet long-range large corporate jet
Boeing 2707 Supersonic airliner project
Boeing Vertol V.107 heavylift utility helicopter
Boeing Commercial Chinook heavylift utility and airliner helicopter
Boeing Stearman two-seat utility and agricultural biplane

Boeing Canada
Boeing-Canada C-204 Thunderbird 4-seat utility biplane flying boat
Boeing-Canada A-213 Totem monoplane utility flying boat

Boisavia
Boisavia Mercurey four-seat cabin monoplane
Boisavia Chablis two-seat open-cockpit monoplane kitplane

Bölkow
Bölkow Bo 207  four-seat light aircraft
Bölkow Bo 208 two-seat light aircraft
Bölkow Phoebus single-seat competition sailplane
Bölkow Phönix single seat competition sailplane

Bombardier
Bombardier Challenger 300 corporate jet
Bombardier Challenger 600/601/604/605 long-range corporate jets
Bombardier Challenger 850 large long-range corporate jet
Bombardier CSeries CS100/CS300 narrowbody airliner
Bombardier CRJ100/200 CRJ100/CRJ200/CRJ400/CRJ550/ regional jet/business jet
Bombardier CRJ700 series CRJ700/CRJ900/CRJ1000 regional jet
Bombardier Global 5000 long-range high-capacity corporate jet
Bombardier Global 7500 long-range high-capacity corporate jet
Bombardier Global 8000 long-range high-capacity corporate jet
Bombardier Global Express long range, high-capacity corporate jet
Bombardier Learjet 40 corporate jet
Bombardier Learjet 45 corporate jet
Bombardier Learjet 55 & 60 corporate jets
Bombardier Learjet 70/75 corporate jet
Bombardier Learjet 85 corporate jet
Bombardier Dash Q400 Turboprop airliner
Bombardier Dash Q300 Turboprop airliner

Bonomi
Bonomi BS.19 Alca single-seat motor glider
Bonomi BS.22 Alzavola single-seat motor glider

Boom Supersonic
XB-1 Planned one-third scale supersonic demonstrator
Boom Overture planned supersonic airliner

Boulton & Paul
Boulton Paul P.6 two-seat open biplane
Boulton & Paul P.64 Mailplane twin-engine biplane mailplane
Boulton & Paul P.71A twin-engine biplane mailplane
Boulton Paul Phoenix single-engined two-seat parasol monoplane ultralight

Brantly
Brantly B-2 & 305 Light piston-powered utility helicopters

Breese
Breese-Dallas Model 1 single-engine monoplane airliner
Breese-Wilde Model 5 single-engine monoplane racer

Breda
Breda Ba.15 two-seat light sportsplane
Breda Ba.32 trimotor airliner
Breda Ba.33 two-seat light sportsplane
Breda Ba.39 two-seat touring monoplane
Breda Ba.44 twin-engine biplane airliner
Breda-Zappata BZ.308 four-engine airliner

Breguet
Breguet 14T biplane bombers converted into mailplanes and airliners
Breguet 22T single-engine biplane airliner
Breguet 26T single-engine biplane airliner
Breguet 280T single-engine biplane airliner
Breguet 393T trimotor sesquiplane airliner
Bréguet 470 Fulgur twin-engine monoplane airliner
Bréguet 500 Colmar twin-engine monoplane airliner
Breguet 530 Saigon trimotor biplane flying boat airliner
Breguet 670 twin-engine monoplane airliner
Breguet 760 Provence/Sahara four-engine double deck airliner/transport nicknamed Deux-Ponts
Breguet 890 Mercure twin-engine transport
Bréguet 900 Louisette sailplane
Bréguet 941 4-engine airliner/transport

Bristol
Bristol Badminton single-seat racing biplane
Bristol Brownie 1920s monoplane ultralight
Bristol Coupé & Bristol Tourer modified fighter as small airliner
Bristol Pullman biplane airliner
Bristol Type 62 Ten-seater biplane airliner
Bristol Type 72 Racer racing monoplane
Bristol Type 143 twin-engine airliner
Bristol 167 Brabazon luxury long-range airliner
Bristol 170 Freighter Short-range freighter/utility transport
Bristol 175 Britannia long-range turboprop airliner

Brown-Young
Brown-Young BY-1

British Aircraft Manufacturing
British Aircraft Swallow two-seat ultralight monoplane
British Aircraft Eagle two-seat cabin monoplane
British Aircraft Double Eagle twin-engine 6-seat cabin monoplane

Britten-Norman
Britten-Norman BN-1 single-seat ultralight
Britten-Norman Islander Commuter airliner and light utility transport
Britten-Norman Trislander Commuter airliner
Britten-Norman Nymph 4-seat private aircraft

Brochet
Brochet MB.50 single-seat open-cockpit ultralight
Brochet MB.70 two-seat cabin monoplane
Brochet MB.80 two-seat cabin monoplane
Brochet MB.100 three-seat cabin monoplane

Brunner-Winkle
Brunner-Winkle Bird three-seat open-cockpit passenger biplane

Buhl
Buhl CA-1 Airster monoplane racer and mailplane
Buhl-Verville CA-3 Airster three-seat utility biplane
Buhl Airsedan single-engine utility cabin sesquiplane
Buhl Bull Pup single-seat monoplane sportsplane

Burnelli
Burnelli RB-1 biplane lifting body airliner
Burnelli UB-14 monoplane lifting body airliner
Burnelli UB-20 monoplane lifting body airliner
Burnelli UB-22/GX-3 monoplane lifting body transport

C

CAB
CAB GY-20 Cab two-seat cabin monoplane
CAB GY-30 Supercab two-seat cabin monoplane

CAMS
CAMS 37 single-engine airmail flying boat
CAMS 51 twin-engine airmail and passenger flying boat
CAMS 53 twin-engine airmail and passenger flying boat
CAMS 56 twin-engine airmail and passenger flying boat 
CAMS 58 twin-engine airmail and passenger flying boat
CAMS 161 four-engine airliner flying boat

Canadair
Canadair North Star four-engine airliner
Canadair CL-44 Yukon airliner and freighter
Canadair CL-215 waterbomber and utility amphibian
Canadair CL-415 waterbomber and utility amphibian
Canadair Challenger widebody corporate jet
Canadair CRJ200 Regional Jet feederliner
Canadair CRJ-700 Regional Jet feederliner

Canadian Vickers
Canadian Vickers Vedette amphibious biplane forestry patrol flying boat

CAP Aviation (now Apex Aircraft)
Mudry CAP 10 two-seat aerobatics aircraft and trainer
Mudry CAP 20 competition aerobatics monoplane
Mudry CAP 222 two-seat  competition aerobatics monoplane
Mudry CAP 230 single-seat aerobatic monoplane

Capelis
Capelis XC-12 12 passenger twin-engine low-wing monoplane

Caproni
Caproni Ca.48 airliner converted from bomber
Caproni Ca.60 tandem triplane flying boat
Caproni Ca.100 two-seat open sports/training biplane
Caproni Ca.101 trimotor monoplane airliner
Caproni Ca.123 twin engine monoplane airliner
Caproni Ca.132 trimotor monoplane airliner
Caproni Ca.133 trimotor monoplane airliner
Caproni Ca.308 Borea twin-engine monoplane airliner
Caproni Ca.309 twin-engine airliner

CASA
CASA C-212 Aviocar STOL turboprop regional airliner and utility transport
CASA CN-235 Utility transport and 45-seat regional airliner

Caudron
Caudron C.21 twin-engine 3-seat touring biplane
Caudron C.23bis twin-engine biplane airliner
Caudron C.33 Landaulet Monsieur-Madame twin-engine biplane airliner
Caudron C.37 twin-engine biplane airliner
Caudron C.39 trimotor biplane airliner
Caudron C.43 five-engine biplane airliner
Caudron C.60 two seat biplane trainer/sport aircraft
Caudron C.61 trimotor airliner
Caudron C.67 aerobatics biplane
Caudron C.68 single-engine touring biplane
Caudron C.74 four-engine airliner
Caudron C.109 two-seat utility/sport parasol monoplane
Caudron C.180 trimotor airliner
Caudron C.190 two-seat sport monoplane
Caudron C.230 sport biplane
Caudron C.270 Luciole two-seat biplane trainer and touring aircraft
Caudron C.280 Phalène utility monoplane
Caudron C.440 Goéland twin-engine airliner
Caudron C.480 Frégate three seat touring monoplane
Caudron C.510 Pélican touring monoplane
Caudron C.600 Aiglon two-seat sport monoplane
Caudron C.630 Simoun single-engine transport
Caudron C.640 Typhon twin-engine racing and mail monoplane

Central Aircraft
Central Centaur IIA twin-engine passenger biplane
Central Centaur IV single-engine passenger biplane

Cessna
Cessna Model A
Cessna CR-2 racing monoplane
Cessna CR-3 racing monoplane
Cessna C-34, C-37, C-38, C-145 & C-165 Airmaster series of light utility aircraft
Cessna T-50 Bobcat/Crane
Cessna 120 two-seat light aircraft, economy version of the Cessna 140
Cessna 140 two-seat light aircraft.
Cessna 150 & 152 two-seat primary and aerobatic trainers
Cessna 162 Skycatcher two-seat light-sport aircraft
Cessna 170 four-seat light aircraft
Cessna 172 Skyhawk
Cessna 175 Skylark four-seat light aircraft
Cessna 177 Cardinal and Cardinal RG four-seat light aircraft
Cessna 180 & 185 Skywagon utility aircraft
Cessna 182 four-seat light aircraft
Cessna 188 AGwagon, AGpickup, AGtruck, and AGhusky crop dusters
Cessna 190 & 195 five-seat light aircraft with radial engine.
Cessna 205, 206 & 207 six-seat utility aircraft.
Cessna 208 Caravan I, Grand Caravan & Cargomaster turboprop utility transport
Cessna 210 Centurion four- to six-seat light aircraft
Cessna T303 Crusader six-seat corporate and utility transport
Cessna 310 four- to six-seat light piston twin
Cessna 320 Skyknight four- to six-seat light piston twin
Cessna 336 & 337 Skymaster six-seat light piston twins
Cessna 335 & 340 six-seat twin-engine airliner
Cessna 350 & 400 four-seat light aircraft
Cessna 401 & 402 twin-engine light transport
Cessna 404 Titan ten-seat utility aircraft
Cessna 408 SkyCourier turboprop utility transport
Cessna 411 six- to eight-seat business twin
Cessna 414 Chancellor pressurized cabin twin
Cessna 421 Golden Eagle pressurized cabin twin
Cessna 425 Corsair/Conquest I pressurized turboprop cabin twin
Cessna 441 Conquest II pressurized turboprop cabin twin feederliner
Cessna 500 & 501 Citation, Citation I & Citation I/SP light corporate jets
Cessna 510 Citation Mustang light corporate jet
Cessna 525 CJ1, CJ2, CJ3 & CJ4 CitationJet series light corporate jets
Cessna 550 Citation II & 551 Citation II & Bravo light corporate jets
Cessna 560 Citation V, Ultra & Ultra Encore small to midsize corporate jets
Cessna 560XL Citation Excel corporate jet
Cessna 650 Citation III, VI & VII corporate jets
Cessna 680 Citation Sovereign corporate jet
Cessna 750 Citation X long-range corporate jet
Cessna 850 Citation Columbus intercontinental corporate jet
Cessna Citation Longitude intercontinental corporate jet

Champion
Champion Citabria two-seat high-wing aerobatic utility aircraft

Chester
Chester Jeep racing monoplane
Chester Goon racing monoplane

Chichester-Miles
Chichester-Miles Leopard four-seat light jet

Chilton
Chilton D.W.1 single-seat sportsplane

Chrislea
Chrislea Ace four-seat light utility aircraft
Chrislea Super Ace four-seat light utility aircraft
Chrislea Skyjeep four-seat light utility aircraft

Christen
Christen Eagle aerobatic homebuilt biplane

Cierva
Cierva C.19 two-seat open-cockpit autogyro
Cierva C.24 two-seat cabin autogyro
Cierva C.30 two-seat open-cockpit autogyro
Cierva C.29 5-seat cabin autogyro

Cirrus
Cirrus SR20 & SR22 four- to five-seat light aircraft
Cirrus Vision SF50 five to seven-seat light jet
Cirrus VK-30 & ST-50 five-seat pusher homebuilt developed into a turboprop
Cirrus SRS two-seat light-sport aircraft

Civilian
Civilian Coupé single-engined two-seat private monoplane

COMAC
Comac ARJ21 twin-engined regional jet
Comac C919 narrow-body airliner under development

Command-Aire
Command-Aire 3C3 three-seat open cockpit utility biplane
Command-Aire 4C3 three-seat open cockpit utility biplane
Command-Aire 5C3 three-seat open cockpit utility biplane

Commercial
Commercial C-1 Sunbeam single-engine biplane airliner and record aircraft

Commonwealth (US)
Commonwealth Skyranger two-seat utility monoplane

Commonwealth Aircraft Corporation (Australia)
CAC Ceres crop duster developed from Wirraway trainer

Comper
Comper Swift single-engine single-seat parasol-wing sports biplane
Comper Mouse three-seat low-wing cabin monoplane
Comper Streak single-engined, single-seat low-wing racing monoplane
Comper Kite single-engined, two-seat touring monoplane

Conroy
Conroy Skymonster oversized freighter derived from Canadair CL-44

Consolidated
Consolidated Commodore twin-engine flying boat airliner
Consolidated Fleetster single-engine monoplane airliner
Consolidated Model 39 Liberator Liner four-engine monoplane airliner
Consolidated PBY Catalina twin-engine flying boat waterbomber and transport
Consolidated PB4Y-2 Privateer bomber repurposed as water bomber

Convair
Convair 240/340/440 short-haul airliners
Convair CV-540/580/600/640/5800 short-haul turboprop airliners
Convair CV-880 four-jet airliner
Convair CV-990 four-jet airliner

Couzinet
Couzinet 70 Arc en Ciel trimotor airliner and mailplane

Cranwell
Cranwell CLA.4 1920s single-engined two-seat sesquiplane ultralight

Crawford
Crawford CLM all-metal high-wing cabin monoplane

C.R.D.A. CANT (Cantieri Aeronautici e Navali Triestini)
CANT 6 trimotor biplane flying boat airliner
CANT 10 single-engine biplane flying boat airliner
CANT 18 single-engine flying boat trainer
CANT 22 trimotor flying boat airliner
CANT Z.506A trimotor transport floatplane
CANT Z.509 trimotor floatplane mailplane
CANT Z.1010 single-engine airliner
CANT Z.1012 3-passenger trimotor airliner

Culver
Culver Dart two-seat sports monoplane
Culver Cadet two-seat sports monoplane
Culver Model V two-seat cabin monoplane

Cunliffe-Owen
Cunliffe-Owen Concordia twin-engine airliner
Clyde Clipper twin-engine lifting-body airliner

Cunningham-Hall
Cunningham-Hall GA-21M low-wing open-cockpit monoplane
Cunningham-Hall PT-6 cabin monoplane

Curtiss
Curtiss Autoplane roadable airplane
Curtiss Carrier Pigeon biplane mailplane
Curtiss Condor 18 twin-engine biplane airliner
Curtiss Cox Racer monoplane/biplane/triplane racing aircraft
Curtiss Eagle biplane airliner
Curtiss F sport biplane flying boat
Curtiss Falcon biplane mailplane
Curtiss Fledgling training and sport biplane
Curtiss HS forestry patrol biplane flying boat
Curtiss JN-4 "Jenny" two-seat open-cockpit training biplane used for barnstorming
Curtiss Kingbird twin-engine monoplane airliner
Curtiss Lark biplane mailplane and bushplane
Curtiss MF biplane sport flying boat
Curtiss Night Mail biplane mailplane
Curtiss Oriole training biplane
Curtiss Robin three-seat sport/touring monoplane
Curtiss Thrush five-seat cabin monoplane

Curtiss Canada
Curtiss JN-4 (Canadian) "Canuck" two-seat open-cockpit training biplane used for barnstorming

Curtiss-Reid
Curtiss-Reid Courier single-seat mailplane and sport monoplane
Curtiss-Reid Rambler two-seat open sport biplane

Curtiss-Wright
(absorbed Travel Air)
Curtiss-Wright CW-1 Junior two-seat sports monoplane
Curtiss-Wright CW-3 Duckling two-seat amphibious flying boat
Curtiss CW-4/T-32 Condor II biplane airliner
Curtiss-Wright CW-6 6-seat cabin utility monoplane
Curtiss-Wright CW-12 open-cockpit sports biplane
Curtiss-Wright CW-14 Travel Air/Sportsman Deluxe open-cockpit sports biplane
Curtiss-Wright CW-19 light cabin transport
Curtiss CW-20/C-46 Commando twin-engine airliner/freighter

D

Dassault
Dassault Falcon 10 & 100 light corporate jet
Dassault Falcon 20, 30 & 200 corporate jet and utility transport
Dassault Falcon 2000 transcontinental-range midsize to large corporate jet
Dassault Falcon 50 long-range midsize corporate jet
Dassault Falcon 5X midsize corporate jet
Dassault Falcon 7X long-range corporate jet
Dassault Falcon 900 long-range corporate jet
Dassault Mercure narrowbody jet

Davis
Davis D-1 light open-cockpit two-seat parasol monoplane

de Havilland
(see also Airco)
de Havilland DH.18 biplane airliner
de Havilland DH.34 biplane airliner
de Havilland DH.37 touring biplane
de Havilland DH.50 biplane airliner
de Havilland DH.53 Humming Bird ultralight monoplane
de Havilland DH.54 Highclere two-seat sport biplane
de Havilland DH.61 Giant Moth single-engine biplane airliner
de Havilland DH.66 Hercules trimotor biplane airliner
de Havilland DH.71 Tiger Moth racing monoplane
de Havilland DH.75 Hawk Moth single-engine cabin monoplane
de Havilland DH.80 Puss Moth three-seat cabin monoplane
de Havilland DH.82 Tiger Moth single-engine cabin biplane airliner
de Havilland DH.84 Dragon twin-engine biplane airliner
de Havilland DH.85 Leopard Moth small cabin monoplane
de Havilland DH.86 Express 4-engine biplane airliner
de Havilland DH.87 Hornet Moth two-seat cabin biplane
de Havilland DH.88 Comet two-seat twin-engine racer
de Havilland DH.89 Dragon Rapide twin-engine biplane airliner
de Havilland DH.90 Dragonfly twin-engine cabin biplane
de Havilland DH.91 Albatross four-engine monoplane airliner and mailplane
de Havilland DH.95 Flamingo twin-engine monoplane airliner
de Havilland DH.104 Dove twin-engine commuter airliner and executive transport
de Havilland DH.106 Comet jet airliner
de Havilland DH.114 Heron four-engine commuter airliner

de Havilland Australia
de Havilland Australia DHA-3 Drover trimotor monoplane used for flying doctor service

de Havilland Canada
de Havilland Canada DHC-1 Chipmunk two-seat light training and sport aircraft
de Havilland Canada DHC-2 Beaver single-engine STOL utility transport
de Havilland Canada DHC-3 Otter single-engine STOL utility transport
de Havilland Canada DHC-4 Caribou twin-engine STOL utility transport
de Havilland Canada DHC-5 Buffalo twin-engine STOL utility transport
de Havilland Canada DHC-6 Twin Otter twin-engine STOL turboprop regional airliner and utility transport
de Havilland Canada DHC-7 Dash 7 four-engine turboprop STOL regional airliner
de Havilland Canada DHC-8 Dash 8 twin turboprop regional airliner

Dean-Wilson Aviation
Whitney Boomerang two-seat sport/training aircraft

Denney
Denney Kitfox two-seat light utility monoplane

Deperdussin (Société Pour L'Aviation et ses Dérivés)
Deperdussin 1910 monoplane sport monoplane
Deperdussin 1912 Racing Monoplane 
Deperdussin Monocoque racing monoplane

Desoutter
Desoutter three-seat cabin monoplane air taxi

Dewoitine
Dewoitine D.7 single seat sportsplane
Dewoitine D.14 single-engine monoplane airliner 
Dewoitine D.30 single-engine monoplane airliner
Dewoitine D.33 single-engine monoplane distance record aircraft
Dewoitine D.35 single-engine monoplane airliner
Dewoitine D.332 trimotor monoplane airliner
Dewoitine D.338 trimotor monoplane airliner
Dewoitine D.342 trimotor monoplane airliner
Dewoitine D.620 trimotor monoplane airliner
Dewoitine P-2 glider
Dewoitine P-3 glider
Dewoitine P-4 glider

Diamond
Diamond DA20 Katana two-seat single-engine light aircraft
Diamond DA40 Diamond Star twin-engine light aircraft
Diamond DA42 Twin Star twin-engined light aircraft
Diamond DA50five seat, single-engine light aircraft
Diamond DA52 five to seven seat twin-engined light aircraft
Diamond DA62 five to seven seat twin-engined light aircraft
Diamond D-Jet five-seat single-engined light jet aircraft
Diamond HK36 Super Dimona two-seat motorglider

Dornier
Dornier Delphin I single-engine transport flying boat
Dornier Delphin II single-engine transport flying boat
Dornier Delphin III single-engine transport flying boat
Dornier Do C III Komet I single-engine parasol monoplane airliner
Dornier Do Komet II single-engine parasol monoplane airliner
Dornier Do Komet III single-engine parasol monoplane airliner
Dornier Do A Libelle single-engine monoplane flying boat
Dornier Do B Merkur single-engine parasol monoplane airliner
Dornier Spatz single-engine monoplane landplane derived from Libelle
Dornier Do R Superwal four-engine parasol monoplane flying boat
Dornier Do J Wal twin-engine transport flying boat
Dornier Do K1 & K2 four-engine high-wing monoplane airliner
Dornier Do K3 four-engine high-wing monoplane airliner
Dornier Do S four-engine monoplane flying boat
Dornier Do X twelve-engine monoplane transatlantic flying boat
Dornier Do 18 twin-engine flying boat mailplane
Dornier Do 26 four-engine gull-wing monoplane catapult-launched mailplane flying boat
Dornier Do 27 STOL utility light aircraft
Dornier Do 28 utility transport
Dornier Do 128 utility transport
Dornier 228 turboprop utility aircraft
Dornier 328 turboprop feederliner
Dornier 328JET jet powered feederliner

Douglas
(for later types see McDonnell Douglas)
Douglas DB-7/A-20 Havoc twin-engine bombers converted into executive aircraft
Douglas DC-1 twin-engine monoplane airliner
Douglas DC-2 twin-engine monoplane airliner
Douglas DST (Sleeper Transport) twin-engine monoplane airliner
Douglas DC-3 twin-engine monoplane airliner and freighter
Douglas DC-4E experimental four-engine monoplane airliner and freighter
Douglas DC-4 four-engine monoplane airliner and freighter
Douglas DC-5 twin-engine monoplane airliner
Douglas DC-6 four-engine monoplane airliner and freighter
Douglas DC-7 four-engine monoplane airliner and freighter
Douglas DC-8 jet airliner and freighter
Douglas DC-9 jet airliner
Douglas DC-10 widebody tri-jet airliner
Douglas DF commercial twin-engine monoplane flying boat
Douglas Dolphin executive transport and small airliner
Douglas M-1, 2, 3 & 4 single-engine biplane mailplanes
Douglas Sinbad executive transport and small airliner

Driggs
Driggs Dart open-cockpit sports biplane
Driggs Skylark two-seat sport biplane

Druine
Druine Turbulent single-seat monoplane ultralight homebuilt
Druine Turbi two-seat open-cockpit monoplane homebuilt
Druine Condor two-seat sport/training monoplane

Dyle et Bacalan
Dyle et Bacalan DB-70 trimotor lifting-body airliner

E

Eagle Aircraft (US)
Eagle Aircraft Eagle

Eagle Aircraft (Australia)
Eagle Aircraft Eagle 150

Eastman
Eastman E-2 Sea Rover two-three-seat utility flying boat

Eclipse Aviation/Aerospace
Eclipse 400 light jet
Eclipse 500 light jet
Eclipse 550 & 700 light jets

Edge
Edge 540 aerobatic and racing aircraft

Edgley
Edgley Optica light aircraft

 utility/VIP helicopter-->

English Electric
English Electric Wren single-seat monoplane ultralight

Embraer
Embraer EMB 110 Bandeirante turboprop multi-purpose aircraft
Embraer EMB 120 Brasilia 30-seat turboprop regional airliner
Embraer EMB 121 Xingu turboprop utility aircraft
Embraer/FMA CBA 123 Vector turboprop regional airliner
Embraer ERJ 135 regional jet airliner
Embraer ERJ 140 regional jet airliner
Embraer ERJ 145 regional jet airliner
Embraer 170 medium-range jet airliner
Embraer 175 medium-range jet airliner
Embraer 190 medium-range jet airliner
Embraer 195 medium-range jet airliner
Embraer Lineage 1000 corporate jet
Embraer Legacy 450 mid-light corporate jet
Embraer Legacy 500 mid-size corporate jet
Embraer Legacy 600 corporate jet
Embraer Legacy 650 evolution of Legacy 600
Embraer Phenom 100 light corporate jet
Embraer Phenom 300 light corporate jet
Embraer Praetor 500 mid-size corporate jet
Embraer Praetor 600 mid-size corporate jet

Emigh
Emigh A-2 Trojan single-engine two-seat monoplane

Enstrom
Enstrom F-28 and 280 light helicopter
Enstrom TH180 light helicopter
Enstrom 480 light helicopter

ERCO
ERCO Ercoupe two-seat light aircraft

Europa
Europa XS two-seat kitplane

Eurocopter
(see also Aérospatiale)
Eurocopter Super Puma medium lift utility helicopter
Eurocopter Ecureuil light utility helicopter
Eurocopter Ecureuil 2 twin-engined light utility helicopter
Eurocopter Dauphin 2 & EC-155 twin-engine utility helicopter
Eurocopter BO 105 & EC Super Five light utility helicopter
Eurocopter Colibri light utility helicopter
Eurocopter EC-135/635 twin-turbine utility helicopter
MBB/Kawasaki BK117 twin-engine utility helicopter

Evangel
Evangel 4500 twin-engine utility transport

Extra Aircraft
Extra 200 aerobatic aircraft
Extra 230 aerobatic aircraft
Extra 300 aerobatic aircraft
Extra 400 six-seat utility transport
Extra 500 six-seat utility transport

F

Fairchild
Fairchild 21 two-seat sport biplane
Fairchild 22 two-seat parasol monoplane
Fairchild 24 Argus single-engine cabin monoplane
Fairchild 42 single-engine monoplane airliner and transport
Fairchild 45 single-engine low wing transport
Fairchild F-46 single-engine low wing transport
Fairchild 51 single-engine monoplane airliner and transport
Fairchild 71 single-engine monoplane airliner and transport
Fairchild 91 single-engine amphibious flying boat
Fairchild 100 single-engine monoplane airliner and transport
Fairchild 150 single-engine airliner
Fairchild FC-2 single-engine monoplane airliner and transport
Fairchild KR-31 two-seat sport biplane
Fairchild KR-34 two-seat sport biplane

Fairchild Canada
Fairchild Super 71 single-engine utility monoplane
Fairchild 82 single-engine utility monoplane
Fairchild 45-80 Sekani twin-engine utility monoplane
Fairchild F-11 Husky single-engine utility monoplane

Fairchild Dornier/Swearingen
Fairchild (Swearingen) Merlin turboprop corporate transport
Fairchild Dornier 228 regional airliner and utility transport
Fairchild Dornier 328 regional turboprop airliner
Fairchild Dornier 328JET & 428JET regional jet airliner
Fairchild Aerospace SA226 Metro II & SA227 Metro III & 23 regional airliner

Farman
Farman F.60 Goliath twin-engine biplane airliner
Farman F.65 David/Sport ultralight sport biplane
Farman F.70 single-engine biplane airliner
Farman F.90 single-engine biplane airliner
Farman F.120 multi-engine monoplane airliner
Farman F.161/162/163/169 twin-engine biplane airliner
Farman F.170 Jabiru single-engine airliner
Farman F.180 Oiseau Bleu twin-engine airliner
Farman F.190 single-engine monoplane transport
Farman F.200 two-seat touring aircraft
Farman F.200 single-engine utility transport
Farman F.220/223/224 four-engine mailplane/airliner 
Farman F.230 two-seat trainer/utility/sport monoplane
Farman F.280 trimotor mailplane
Farman F.300 trimotor monoplane airliner
Farman F.310 trimotor monoplane airliner
Farman F.370 racing monoplane
Farman F.380 racing monoplane
Farman F.390 single-engine monoplane transport
Farman Moustique ultralight sport monoplane

FFA
FFA AS-202 Bravo two-seat basic trainer and aerobatic light aircraft

Fiat
Fiat AS.1 two-seat touring and sport monoplane
Fiat G.5 two-seat aerobatic tourer/trainer
Fiat G.12 trimotor airliner
Fiat G.18 twin engined airliner
Fiat G.212 trimotor airliner

Fleet
Fleet 50 Freighter twin-engine utility biplane
Fleet 80 Canuck two-seat utility sport monoplane

Fleetwings
Fleetwings Seabird single-engine utility amphibian

Focke-Wulf
Focke-Wulf A 16 single-engine cabin monoplane airliner
Focke-Wulf A 17 Möwe single-engine monoplane airliner
Focke-Wulf GL 18 twin-engine cabin monoplane airliner
Focke-Wulf A 32 Bussard single-engine monoplane airliner
Focke-Wulf A 33 Sperber<!-1930---> single-engine monoplane airliner
Focke-Wulf A 38 Möwe single-engine monoplane airliner
Focke-Wulf Fw 43 Falke single-engine utility monoplane
Focke-Wulf Fw 47 Höhengeier single-engine meteorological parasol monoplane
Focke-Wulf Fw 200 Condor four-engine monoplane airliner

Fokker
(for US aircraft see Atlantic Aircraft)
Fokker C.II single-engine biplane transport
Fokker C.IV single-engine biplane airliner
Fokker F.II single-engine monoplane airliner
Fokker F.III single-engine monoplane airliner
Fokker F.V convertible biplane/monoplane airliner
Fokker F.VII single-engine and trimotor monoplane airliner/transport
Fokker F.VIII twin-engine monoplane airliner
Fokker F.IX trimotor monoplane airliner
Fokker F.XII trimotor monoplane airliner
Fokker F.XVIII trimotor monoplane airliner
Fokker F.XX trimotor airliner
Fokker F.XXII four-engine high-wing monoplane airliner
Fokker F.XXXVI four-engine high-wing monoplane airliner
Fokker F27 Friendship regional airliner
Fokker F28 Fellowship regional jet airliner
Fokker 50 turboprop regional airliner
Fokker 70 regional jetliner
Fokker 100 regional jetliner

Foster, Wikner
Foster Wikner Wicko two-seat cabin monoplane

Found Brothers
Found FBA-1 four-seat cabin utility monoplane
Found FBA-2 five-seat cabin utility monoplane
Found Centennial 100 five-seat cabin utility monoplane

Fournier
Fournier RF-1 two-seat motorglider
Fournier RF-2 two-seat motorglider
Fournier RF-3 two-seat motorglider
Fournier RF-4 single-seat motorglider
Fournier RF-5 two-seat motorglider
Fournier RF-6 two-seat low-wing monoplane sport trainer
Fournier RF-7 single-seat motorglider
Fournier RF-9 two-seat motorglider
Fournier RF-10 two-seat motorglider

Ford
3-AT 1924 
Ford 4-AT Trimotor airliner
Ford 5-AT Trimotor airliner 
Ford 6-AT Trimotor airliner
Ford 7-AT Trimotor airliner
Ford 8-AT Trimotor Freighter freighter
Ford 9-AT Trimotor airliner
Ford 11-AT Trimotor airliner
Ford 14-AT airliner
Ford Model 15-P two-seat sport monoplane
Ford Flivver single-seat sport monoplane

Four Winds
Four Winds FX-210 four-seat light aircraft

Friedrichshafen
Friedrichshafen FF.45 cargo and passenger biplane converted from bomber
Friedrichshafen FF.49 biplane floatplane used by Lloyd-Luftverkehr

Fuji
Fuji FA-200 Aero Subaru four-seat light aircraft
Fuji FA-300 twin-engine light transport

Funk
Funk B two-seat cabin monoplane

G

Gasuden
Gasuden KR-2 small single-engine biplane airliner

Government Aircraft Factories
GAF Nomad STOL utility transport

General Aircraft (UK)
General Aircraft Croydon twin-engine monoplane airliner
General Aircraft Cygnet single-engine low wing sports monoplane
General Aircraft Monospar single and twin-engine cabin monoplanes
General Aircraft Monospar ST-25 twin-engine airliner

General Aviation (US)
General Aviation GA-43 single-engine monoplane airliner

Giles
Giles G-200 single-seat competition aerobatic aircraft
Giles G-202 two-seat competition aerobatic aircraft

Gippsland Aeronautics/GippsAero
Gippsland GA8 Airvan single-engine high-wing utility aircraft
Gippsland GA10 Airvan 10 single-engine high-wing utility aircraft
Gippsland GA-200 Fatman two-seat agricultural aircraft

Globe
Globe GC-1 Swift two-seat sports monoplane

Gloster
Gloster Gannet single-seat ultralight biplane

Granville Brothers
Granville Gee Bee Model A sport biplane
Granville Gee Bee Sportster (X, B, C, D, E, F) racing monoplanes
Granville Gee Bee Model Y Senior Sportster racing monoplane
Granville Gee Bee Model Z Super Sportster racing monoplane
Granville Gee Bee Model R Super Sportster racing monoplane
Granville Gee Bee R-6 Q.E.D. racing monoplane

Great Lakes
Great Lakes Sport Trainer two seat biplane

Grob
Grob G 109 two-seat motorglider
Grob G 115 two-seat basic and aerobatic trainer
Grob GF 200 four-seat light aircraft
Grob G180 SPn twin-engined corporate jet

Grumman
Grumman American AA-1 two-seat light aircraft
Grumman American AA-5 Traveler, Tiger & Cheetah Four-seat light aircraft
Grumman G-21 Goose twin-engine utility amphibian
Grumman G-44 Widgeon twin-engine utility amphibian
Grumman G-63 Kitten cabin sport utility monoplane
Grumman G-65 Tadpole amphibious lightplane
Grumman G-73 Mallard amphibious feederliner
Grumman G-159 Gulfstream I corporate transport and regional airliner
Grumman G-164 Ag-Cat biplane agricultural aircraft
Grumman G-1159 Gulfstream II long-range corporate jet

Gulfstream
Gulfstream III long-range business jet
Gulfstream American GA-7 Cougar four-place light twin
Gulfstream Aerospace Gulfstream IV long-range business jet
Gulfstream Aerospace Gulfstream V long-range business jet
Gulfstream Aerospace Jetprop & Turbo Commander twin turboprop utility transports
Gulfstream G100 small twin-engine business jet
Gulfstream G150 small business jet
Gulfstream G200 twin-engine mid-size business jet
Gulfstream G280 twin-engine mid-size business jet
Gulfstream G500 long-range business jet
Gulfstream G550 long-range business jet
Gulfstream G650 long-range business jet

H

Hamburger Flugzeugbau
Hamburger Flugzeugbau HFB-320 Hansa Jet twin-engine business jet

Handley Page
Handley Page Type Otwin-engine airliners derived from bomber
Handley Page Type W twin-engine and trimotor biplane airliners
Handley Page H.P.42 four-engine biplane airliner
Handley Page Halton transport derived from bomber
Handley Page Hamlet twin-engine or trimotor airliner
Handley Page Herald turboprop airliner and freighter
Handley Page Hermes 4-engine airliner
Handley Page Jetstream regional turboprop airliner
Handley Page Marathon four-engine airliner

Harbin
Harbin Y-11 commuter airliner/utility transport
Harbin Y-12 commuter airliner/utility transport

Harmon
Harmon Mister America

Hawker Beechcraft
Beechcraft Baron
Beechcraft Bonanza
Beechcraft King Air
Beechcraft Super King Air
Beechcraft 1900
Beechcraft Premier I
Hawker 200
Hawker 400XP
Hawker 750
Hawker 850XP
Hawker 900XP
Hawker 1000
Hawker 4000

Hawker Siddeley
Hawker Siddeley H.S.125 corporate jet
Hawker Siddeley HS.141 V/STOL design proposal.
Hawker Siddeley HS 748 (a.k.a. Avro 748)
Hawker Siddeley Trident short/medium-range airliner

Heath
Heath Parasol single-seat homebuilt parasol-wing ultralight

Heinkel
Heinkel HE 12 single-engine catapult-launched mailplane fitted with floats
Heinkel HD 39 single-engine newspaper delivery biplane
Heinkel HD 40 single-engine newspaper delivery biplane
Heinkel He 58 single-engine catapult-launched mailplane fitted with floats
Heinkel He 64 single-engine two-seat touring monoplane
Heinkel He 70 single-engine airliner and mailplane
Heinkel He 111 twin-engine monoplane airliner and mailplane
Heinkel He 116 four-engine long-range mailplane

Helio
Helio Courier STOL utility aircraft

Hess
Hess Blue Bird mailplane and utility transport

Heston
Heston Phoenix single-engine passenger monoplane
Napier-Heston Racer racing monoplane

Hiller
Hiller Model 360 light utility helicopter

Hindustan
HAL Dhruv utility helicopter

Hitachi
Hitachi TR.1 and 2 twin-engine monoplane airliner

Hollsmidt
Hollsmidt 222 twin-engine two-seat cabin homebuilt

Honda
Honda HA-420 HondaJet corporate jet

Howard
Howard 500 VIP twin-engine propeller aircraft

Howard
Howard DGA-3 racing monoplane
Howard DGA-4 racing monoplane
Howard DGA-5 racing monoplane
Howard DGA-6 single-engine cabin racing monoplane
Howard DGA-8, 9, 11 & 12 single-engine cabin utility monoplane
Howard DGA-15 single-engine cabin utility monoplane

Hughes
Hughes H-1 Racer racing monoplane

Hurel-Dubois
Hurel-Dubois HD.31, 32 & 34 twin-engine airliners

I

IAI
IAI Arava STOL utility transport
IAI Westwind corporate jet
IAI Astra corporate jet
IAI Galaxy corporate transport

IAR
IAR-821 monoplane cropduster
IAR-822 monoplane cropduster
IAR 826 monoplane cropduster 
IAR-827 monoplane cropduster
IAR 823 two-seat cabin training monoplane
IAR-824 six-seat utility transport
IAR-46 two-seat training monoplane

ICAR
ICAR 36 single-engine monoplane airliner

Ilyushin
Ilyushin Il-12 twin-engine airliner and utility transport
Ilyushin Il-14 twin-engine airliner and utility transport
Ilyushin Il-18 turboprop airliner
Ilyushin Il-62 medium capacity airliner
Ilyushin Il-76 airliner
Ilyushin Il-86 widebody airliner
Ilyushin Il-96 widebody airliner
Ilyushin Il-103 light aircraft
Ilyushin Il-114 turboprop regional airliner

Indonesian Aerospace
CN-235 civil turboprop airliner
Indonesian Aerospace N-2130 planned commercial jet aircraft
IPTN N-250/RAI R-80 turboprop regional airliner
N-219 turboprop regional airliner
NC-212 civil turboprop airliner

Iniziative Industriali Italiane (3I)
3I Sky Arrow

Interstate
Interstate Cadet light sportsplane

Ireland
Ireland Comet three-seat open biplane
Ireland Neptune four-five seat amphibious biplane flying boat
Ireland Privateer two-seat monoplane sports flying boat

Irkut
Irkut MC-21 twin-jet airliner

Ishikawajima
Ishikawajima R-3 open-cockpit sports biplane

J

Jabiru
Jabiru J120 light aircraft
Jabiru J160 light aircraft
Jabiru J170 light aircraft
Jabiru J230 four-seat light sport
Jabiru J430 light aircraft
Jabiru J400/430/450 four-seat kitplane

Johnson
Johnson Rocket 185 low wing cabin monoplane

Junkers
Junkers A 20 single-engine mailplane
Junkers A 35 single-engine mailplane
Junkers A50 two-seat single-engine sportsplane
Junkers K 16 single-engine cabin monoplane airliner
Junkers F.13 single-engine monoplane airliner
Junkers W.33 single-engine monoplane transport
Junkers W.34 single-engine monoplane transport
Junkers G.24 trimotor monoplane airliner
Junkers G.31 trimotor monoplane airliner
Junkers G.38 four-engine airliner
Junkers Ju 46 single-engine mailplane
Junkers Ju 52 trimotor transport/airliner
Junkers Ju 60 single-engine airliner
Junkers Ju 86 twin-engine airliner
Junkers Ju 90 four-engine airliner
Junkers Ju 160 single-engine airliner

K

Kalinin
Kalinin K-2 single-engine monoplane airliner
Kalinin K-3 single-engine monoplane air ambulance
Kalinin K-4 single-engine monoplane airliner
Kalinin K-5 single-engine monoplane airliner

Kaman Aircraft
Kaman K-1200 K-Max flying crane and utility helicopter

Kamov
Kamov Ka-15 small utility helicopter
Kamov Ka-18 small utility helicopter
Kamov Ka-26, 126 and Ka-226 utility/training helicopters
Kamov Ka-32 utility helicopter
Kamov Ka-115  utility helicopter

Kari-Keen
Kari-Keen 90 Sioux Coupe single-engine cabin monoplane

Kharkiv KhAI-1
Kharkiv KhAI-1 single-engine monoplane airliner

Kawanishi
Kawanishi K-1 biplane mailplane
Kawanishi K-2 racing monoplane
Kawanishi K-3 biplane airliner and mailplane
Kawanishi K-6 biplane floatplane airliner
Kawanishi K-7 biplane floatplane airliner and mailplane
Kawanishi K-8 monoplane floatplane mailplane
Kawanishi K-10 airliner and mailplane

Kawasaki
Kawasaki KAL-2 4-5 seat single-engine sports monoplane
Kawasaki KDC-2/C-2 passenger floatplane
Kawasaki KDC-5/C-5 high-speed mailplane

Kellett
Kellett K-2, 3 & 4 two-seat autogyros
Kellett KD-1 two-seat utility autogyro

Kestrel
Kestrel KL-1 single-engined four-seat utility
Kestrel K250 single-engined four-seat utility

Keystone
Keystone K-55 Pronto single-engine three-seat biplane mailplane
Keystone K-47 Pathfinder trimotor biplane cabin airliner
Keystone K-78 Patrician trimotor monoplane cabin airliner

Keystone-Loening
Keystone-Loening K-84 Commuter single-engine amphibious biplane airliner
Keystone-Loening K-85 Air Yacht single-engine amphibious biplane airliner

Kharkov
Kharkov KhAI-1 single-engine monoplane airliner

Kinner
Kinner Airster two-seat single-engined biplane
Kinner Envoy four-seat cabin monoplane
Kinner Playboy two-seat sporting monoplane
Kinner Sportster single-seat low-wing monoplane
Kinner Sportwing two-seat sporting monoplane

Klemm
Klemm Kl 25 two-seat single-engine sports monoplane
Klemm Kl 26/27/28/30 two-seat single-engine sports monoplane
Klemm Kl 31 four-seat touring monoplane
Klemm Kl 32 enclosed three-seat single-engine touring monoplane
Klemm Kl 35 open-cockpit two-seat single-engine sports monoplane
Klemm Kl 36 four-seat touring monoplane
Klemm Kl 105 two-seat cabin touring monoplane
Klemm Kl 107 two-seat cabin touring monoplane

Koolhoven
Koolhoven F.K.30 single-seat monoplane ultralight
Koolhoven F.K.33 monoplane trimotor airliner
Koolhoven F.K.40 single engine airliner
Koolhoven F.K.43 four-seat single-engined monoplane air taxi
Koolhoven F.K.44 open-cockpit parasol sports monoplane
Koolhoven F.K.45 aerobatics biplane
Koolhoven F.K.48 twin-engine monoplane airliner
Koolhoven F.K.50 twin-engine monoplane airliner
Koolhoven F.K.53 Junior two-seat sports monoplane
Koolhoven F.K.54 three-seat cabin touring monoplane
Koolhoven F.K.57 twin-engine executive transport

Kreider-Reisner
Kreider-Reisner C-2 Challenger sporting biplane
Kreider-Reisner C-4 Challenger sporting biplane
Kreider-Reisner C-6 Challenger sporting biplane

Kreutzer
Kreutzer Air Coach monoplane trimotor airliner

L

Laird
Laird LC-B three-seat commercial biplane
Laird LC-R Speedwing three-seat commercial biplane
Laird LC-EW six-seat high wing cabin monoplane
Laird Solution racing biplane
Laird Super Solution racing biplane
Laird-Turner Meteor LTR-14 racing monoplane

Lake
Lake LA4, Buccaneer amphibious light aircraft
Lake Renegade, Renegade & Turbo Renegade amphibious light aircraft

Lancair
Lancair ES
Lancair IV
Lancair Evolution
Lancair Columbia four-seat light aircraft
Lancair 320 two-seat light monoplane
Lancair Legacy two-seat light monoplane

Lasco
Lasco Lascoter single-engine monoplane airliner and mailplane

Latécoère
Latécoère 15 twin-engine monoplane airliner
Latécoère 17 single-engine airliner
Latécoère 25 single-engine monoplane mailplane and airliner
Latécoère 26 single-engine monoplane mailplane
Latécoère 28 single-engine monoplane mailplane and airliner
Latécoère 300 twin-engine mailplane flying boat
Latécoère 350 trimotor monoplane mailplane and airliner
Latécoère 380 twin-engine mailplane flying boat
Latécoère 631 six-engine transatlantic flying boat

Laville
Laville PS-89 twin-engine monoplane airliner

Learjet
Learjet 23, 24, 25, 28 and 29 corporate jets
Learjet 31 corporate jet
Learjet 35 and 36 corporate jets

Let Kunovice
Let L-40 MetaSokol three/four-seat light aircraft
Let L-410 & L-420 turboprop regional airliners
Let L-610 turboprop regional airliners
Let L-200 Morava twin-engine light twin

Letov Kbely
Letov Š-18 two-seat open-cockpit training biplane
Letov Š-19 single-engine airliner
Letov Š-32 monoplane trimotor airliner
Letov Š-39 two-seat open-cockpit parasol monoplane sportsplane

Lincoln-Page
Lincoln-Page LP-2 three-seat sport biplane
Lincoln-Page LS-2 Sport racing biplane
Lincoln-Page PT open-cockpit two-seat biplane trainer

Lioré et Olivier
Lioré et Olivier LeO 21 twin-engine biplane airliner
Lioré et Olivier LeO H-190 single-engine biplane flying boat airliner
Lioré et Olivier LeO H-242 four-engine monoplane flying boat airliner
Lioré et Olivier LeO H-246 four-engine monoplane flying boat airliner

Lisunov
Lisunov PS-84/Li-2 airliner (development of licence-built Douglas DC-3)

Lockheed
Lockheed Vega single-engine monoplane airliner
Lockheed Air Express single-engine monoplane airliner
Lockheed Model 8 Sirius single-engine monoplane airliner
Lockheed Model 8D Altair sportsplane
Lockheed Model 9 Orion single-engine monoplane airliner
Lockheed Model 10 Electra twin-engine monoplane airliner
Lockheed Model 12 Electra Junior twin-engine monoplane airliner
Lockheed Model 14 Super Electra twin-engine monoplane airliner
Lockheed Model 18 Lodestar twin-engine monoplane airliner
Lockheed Ventura twin-engine bomber rebuilt as executive transport
Lockheed P-2 Neptune patrol bomber repurposed as water bomber
Lockheed P-3 Orion patrol bomber repurposed as water bomber
Lockheed Saturn twin-engine feederliner
Lockheed JetStar large corporate jet
Lockheed 049/649/749 Constellation/[[Lockheed 

L-1049 Super Constellation|L-1049 Super Constellation]] long-range piston-engine airliner
Lockheed L-1649 Starliner final Constellation model
Lockheed L-100 Hercules turboprop freighter
Lockheed L-188 Electra turboprop airliner and freighter
Lockheed L-1011 TriStar trijet widebody airliner

Lockspeiser
Lockspeiser LDA-01 tandem-wing experimental utility transport

Lockwood
Lockwood Aircam two-seat twin-engine utility kit-built airplane

Loening
Loening S-1 Flying Yacht single-engine open-cockpit monoplane airliner
Loening C-2 Air Yacht single-engine amphibious cabin airliner

Luscombe
Luscombe Phantom two-seat monoplane
Luscombe 4 two-seat monoplane
Luscombe 8 Silvaire two-seat monoplane
Luscombe 10 single-seat sport monoplane
Luscombe 11 Sedan four-seat monoplane

Luton Aircraft
Luton Buzzard single-seat open-cockpit low-wing monoplane ultralight
Luton Major two-seat cabin monoplane
Luton Minor single-seat high-wing ultra-light

L.V.G.
LVG C.V passenger and mail biplane converted from observation aircraft
LVG C.VI passenger and mail biplane converted from observation aircraft

M

Macchi
(for later types see Aermacchi)
Macchi M.3 single engine flying boat used as an airliner
Macchi M.16 single-seat sport biplane
Macchi M.C.73 open-cockpit sports biplane
Macchi M.C.94 twin-engine monoplane flying boat airliner
Macchi M.C.100 trimotor monoplane flying boat airliner
Macchi M.B.308 two-seat sport utility aircraft
Macchi M.B.320 twin-engine cabin monoplane

Malmö
Malmö MFI-9 two-seat light sport monoplane

Mansyu/Manshu
Manshū Hayabusa single-engine monoplane airliner

Margański & Mysłowski
Swift S-1 two-seat competition sailplane
MDM MDM-1 Fox two-seat competition sailplane
MDM Solo Fox single-seat competition sailplane
Margański & Mysłowski EM-11 Orka single-engine pusher utility aircraft

Martin
Martin M-130 "China Clipper" long-range flying boat airliner
Martin M-156/PS-30 long-range flying boat airliner
Martin JRM Mars four-engine flying-boat water bomber
Martin 2-0-2 twin piston-engine regional airliner
Martin 3-0-3 twin piston-engine regional airliner
Martin 4-0-4 twin piston-engine regional airliner

Martin-Baker
Martin-Baker MB 1 two-seat low-wing cabin monoplane

Maule
Maule M-4 to M-7 4–5-seat STOL light aircraft

McDonnell Douglas
(for earlier types see Douglas)
McDonnell Douglas DC-9 airliner
McDonnell Douglas DC-10 widebody trijet airliner
McDonnell Douglas MD-11 widebody trijet airliner
McDonnell Douglas MD-80/MD-81/82/83/87/88 medium-range airliner
McDonnell Douglas MD-90 medium-range airliner

MD Helicopters
MD Helicopters MD 500 light utility helicopter
MD Helicopters MD 600 utility helicopter
MD Helicopters MD 900 Explorer light twin helicopter

MDM
MDM-1 Fox two-seat aerobatic glider

Messerschmitt
(for earlier designs see BFW)
Messerschmitt Bf 108 sports monoplane

Messerschmitt-Bölkow-Blohm
(for earlier designs see Bölkow)
MBB Bo 105 and Bo 106 light utility helicopter
MBB Bo 209 Monsun two-seat utility monoplane
MBB 223 Flamingo training and aerobatic monoplane
MBB/Kawasaki BK 117 utility helicopter

Meyers
Meyers OTW-125, OTW-145 and OTW-160 two-seat training biplane
Meyers MAC-125 and MAC-145 two-seat cabin monoplane
Meyers 200 four-seat cabin monoplane

Mil
Mil Mi-1 light utility helicopter
Mil Mi-2 utility helicopter
Mil Mi-4 utility helicopter
Mil Mi-6 heavy lift helicopter
Mil Mi-8 utility helicopter
Mil Mi-10 flying crane helicopter
Mil Mi-17 utility helicopter
Mil Mi-26 heavy lift utility helicopter
Mil Mi-34 light utility helicopter
Mil Mi-38 utility helicopter
Mil V-12 heavy lift helicopter

Miles
Southern Martlet single-engined single-seat biplane sports aircraft
Miles Satyr single-seat aerobatic biplane
Miles Hawk open-cockpit two-seat light monoplane
Miles Hawk Major open-cockpit two-seat light monoplane
Miles Falcon three/four-seat cabin monoplane
Miles Merlin five-seat cabin monoplane
Miles Sparrowhawk single-seat racing and touring monoplane
Miles Peregrine twin-engined monoplane airliner
Miles Whitney Straight two-seat cabin monoplane
Miles Mohawk tandem two-seat enclosed monoplane
Miles Hobby single-engine single-seat low-wing racing monoplane
Miles Monarch three-seat cabin touring monoplane
Miles Mercury four-seat single-engined touring and training monoplane
Miles Messenger four-seat single-engine cabin monoplane
Miles Aerovan twin-engined short-range low-cost utility transport
Miles Gemini twin-engine four-seat touring monoplane
Miles M.68 twin-engine containerized freighter
Miles Merchantman four-engine utility transport
Miles Sparrowjet single-seat twin-jet racer

Millicer
Millicer M10 AirTourer Two-seat aerobatic capable light aircraft

Mitsubishi
Mitsubishi MU-2 twin turboprop utility transport
Mitsubishi MU-300 Diamond twin-engine jet corporate aircraft
Mitsubishi MH2000 airliner helicopter
Mitsubishi Regional Jet/SpaceJet (MRJ) short to medium-range airliner

Mohawk
Mohawk M-1-C Pinto, Redskin and Spurwing two-seat sporting monoplanes
Mohawk M-2-C Chieftain twin-engine monoplane transport

Monocoupe
Monocoupe Model 22 two-seat sports monoplane
Monocoupe 70 two-seat sports monoplane
Monocoupe 90 two-seat sports monoplane
Monocoupe 110 and 110 Special two-seat sports and racing cabin monoplane

Mooney
Mooney M10 Cadet two-seat sport monoplane
Mooney M18 Mite single-seat sport monoplane
Mooney M20 four-seat light aircraft
Mooney M22 Mustang five-seat single-engine airliner
Mooney 301 six-seat single-engine monoplane

Morane-Saulnier
(see also SOCATA)
Morane-Saulnier G two-seat racing monoplane
Morane-Saulnier H single-seat racing monoplane
Morane-Saulnier AI aerobatic and sports monoplane
Morane-Saulnier MS.180 two-seat open-cockpit aerobatic monoplane
Morane-Saulnier MS.230 two-seat open-cockpit aerobatic monoplane
Morane-Saulnier MS.341 two-seat open-cockpit aerobatic monoplane
Morane-Saulnier MS.560 single-seat aerobatic monoplane
Morane-Saulnier MS-700 Pétrel four-seat cabin-monoplane
Morane-Saulnier MS.760 Paris four-seat executive jet
Morane-Saulnier MS-880 Rallye two-four-seat light aircraft

Morrisey/Shinn/Varga
Morrisey 2150/Shinn 2150A/Varga 2150 Kachina tandem two-seat low-wing monoplane

Moss Brothers
Moss M.A.1 tandem two-seat low-winged sporting monoplane
Moss M.A.2 side by side two-seat low-winged sporting monoplane

Murphy Aircraft
Murphy Elite three-seat kitplane STOL utility monoplane
Murphy JDM-8 Single-seat low wing homebuilt ultralight
Murphy Maverick high-wing ultralight
Murphy Moose STOL utility monoplane
Murphy Rebel three-seat kitplane STOL utility monoplane
Murphy Renegade sports biplane
Murphy Super Rebel high-wing utility transport
Murphy Yukon high-wing utility transport

N

Nakajima
Nakajima AT-2 twin-engine airliner

National Aerospace Laboratories (NAL)
NAL Saras Regional turboprop airliner
NAL NM5 cabin lightplane

National Air Service
NAS Air King three-passenger utility biplane

Nationale Vliegtuig Industrie (NVI)
NVI F.K.33 trimotor monoplane airliner

NAMC
NAMC YS-11 twin turboprop regional airliner

New Standard
New Standard D-24, D-25, D-26, D.27, D.28 and D.30 five-seat utility and crop dusting biplane
New Standard D-29, D.31, D.32 and D.33 training biplane

Nicholas-Beazley
Nicholas-Beazley NB-3 two-seat parasol training monoplane
Nicholas-Beazley NB-8G two-seat low-wing sports monoplane

Nieuport & Nieuport-Delage
Nieuport II single-seat racing/sport monoplane
Nieuport IV two-seat racing/sport monoplane
Nieuport VI two-seat racing/sport monoplane
Nieuport-Delage Sesquiplan racing monoplane
Nieuport-Delage NiD 30 single-engine biplane airliner
Nieuport-Delage NiD 37 racing aircraft
Nieuport-Delage NiD 38 single-engine mail/airliner biplane
Nieuport-Delage NiD 39 single-engine mail/airliner biplane
Nieuport-Delage NiD 540 single-engine monoplane airliner
Nieuport-Delage NiD 640 single-engine monoplane airliner
Nieuport-Delage NiD 940 single-engine touring airplane

Noorduyn
Noorduyn Norseman utility transport

Norsk Flyindustri
Norsk Flyindustri Finnmark 5A twin-engine amphibious flying-boat airliner

North American
North American Rockwell 100 Darter/Lark Commander four-seat light aircraft
North American Navion four/five-seat light aircraft
North American Rockwell OV-10 Bronco modified for fighting forest fires

Northrop
Northrop Alpha single-engine monoplane mailplane and airliner
Northrop Beta  single-engine monoplane sportsplane
Northrop Delta single-engine monoplane airliner
Northrop Gamma single-engine monoplane mailplane and racer

NuWaco
NuWaco T-10 single-engine three-seat biplane

O

Ogden
Ogden Osprey trimotor monoplane airliner

Omega Aircraft
Omega BS-12 utility helicopter

P

Pakistan Aeronautical Complex
PAC Super Mushshak two-seat light aircraft
PAC MFI-17 Mushshak two-seat light aircraft

Pacific Aerospace
Pacific Aerospace CT-4 Airtrainer two/three-seat basic trainer
Pacific Aerospace Fletcher FU-24 top dresser
Pacific Aerospace Cresco top dresser & utility aircraft
Pacific Aerospace 750XL utility aircraft

Pander & Son
Pander D single-seat sport and racing monoplane
Pander E two-seat sport and training biplane
Pander P-1 two-seat racing monoplane
Pander S-4 Postjäger monoplane trimotor mailplane
Pander Multipro two/three-seat light sports monoplane

Paramount
Paramount Cabinaire cabin biplane airliner

Parks
Parks P-1 training biplane
Parks P-2 training biplane

Parnall
Parnall Heck single-engined four-seat cabin monoplane
Parnall Imp single-engined two-seat biplane
Parnall Pixie two-seat ultralight that could be flown as a biplane or monoplane
Parnall Elf two-seat touring biplane

Partenavia
Partenavia P.53 Aeroscooter single-seat ultralight autogyro
Partenavia P.55 Tornado two-seat mid-wing monoplane
Partenavia P.68 Victor six/seven-place light twin

Pasped
Pasped W-1 Skylark two-seat low wing monoplane

Percival & Hunting Percival
Percival Gull single-engine three-seat cabin monoplane
Percival Vega Gull single-engine four-seat cabin monoplane
Percival Mew Gull single-seat racing monoplane
Percival Petrel twin-engine airliner
Percival Proctor single-engine three or four-seat cabin monoplane
Percival Merganser twin-engine airliner
Percival Prince twin-engine airliner

Pheasant Aircraft Company
Pheasant H-10 two-seat open-cockpit biplane

Piel
Piel CP.10 Pinocchio
Piel CP.20 Pinocchio I
Piel CP.40 Donald
Piel CP.402
Piel CP.41
Piel CP.100
Piel CP.140
Piel CP.500
Piel Beryl
Piel Diamant
Piel Emeraude
Piel Emeraude Club
Piel Smaragd
Piel Super Diamant
Piel Super Emeraude
Piel Pinocchio II
Piel Saphir
Piel Onyx
Piel Zephir

Piaggio
Piaggio P.136 twin-engine amphibious utility flying-boat
Piaggio P.149 single piston-engine trainer
Piaggio P.166 Portofino commuter airliner and utility transport
Piaggio P.180 Avanti twin turboprop executive transport
Piaggio PD.808 twin-engine business jet

Pietenpol
Pietenpol Air Camper two-seat homebuilt parasol-wing ultralight
Pietenpol Sky Scout two-seat homebuilt parasol-wing ultralight

Pilatus
Pilatus B-4/PC-11 single seat competition sailplane
Pilatus PC-6 Porter and Turbo Porter STOL utility transport
Pilatus PC-12 single-engine regional airliner and corporate turboprop
Pilatus PC-24 light corporate jet

Piper
Piper Aerostar six-seat light twin
Piper Cub Two-seat high-wing light aircraft
Piper J-2 Cub two-seat high-wing light aircraft
Piper J-3 Cub two-seat high-wing light aircraft
Piper J-4 Cub Coupe two-seat high-wing light aircraft
Piper J-5 Cub Cruiser three-seat high-wing light aircraft
Piper PA-6 Sky Sedan four-seat low-wing light aircraft 
Piper PA-7 Skycoupe two-seat low-wing light aircraft
Piper PA-8 Skycycle single-seat low-wing light aircraft
Piper PA-11 Cub Special two-seat high-wing light aircraft
Piper PA-12 Super Cruiser three-seat high-wing light aircraft
Piper PA-14 Family Cruiser four-seat high-wing light aircraft
Piper PA-15 Vagabond two-seat high-wing light aircraft
Piper PA-16 Clipper four-seat high-wing light aircraft
Piper PA-17 Vagabond two-seat high-wing light aircraft
Piper PA-18 Super Cub two-seat utility light aircraft
Piper PA-20 Pacer three or four-seat light aircraft
Piper PA-22 Tri-Pacer, Caribbean & Colt two, three and four-seat light aircraft
Piper PA-23 Apache & Aztec four-seat light twin
Piper PA-24 Comanche four-seat light aircraft
Piper PA-25 Pawnee Agricultural aircraft
Piper PA-28 Cherokee Series light aircraft
Piper PA-28R Cherokee Arrow four-seat light aircraft
Piper PA-30/39 Twin Comanche light twin
Piper PA-31 Chieftain/Mojave/T-1020/T-1040 corporate transport and commuter airliner
Piper PA-31 Navajo/Pressurized Navajo corporate transport and commuter airliner
Piper PA-31T Cheyenne twin turboprop corporate transports
Piper PA-32 Cherokee Six, Lance & Saratoga six-seat light aircraft
Piper PA-34 Seneca six-place light twin
Piper PA-36 Pawnee Brave crop duster
Piper PA-38 Tomahawk two-seat light aircraft
Piper PA-40 Arapaho twin-engined transport
Piper PA-42 Cheyenne III, IIIA & 400LS twin turboprop corporate transports
Piper PA-44 Seminole four-seat light twin
Piper PA-46 Malibu, Malibu Mirage and Malibu Meridian six-seat corporate turboprop

Pipistrel d.o.o Ajdovščina
Pipistrel Alpha Trainer
Pipistrel Apis
Pipistrel Apis 13
Pipistrel Apis 15 M
Pipistrel Panthera
Pipistrel Sinus
Pipistrel Spider
Pipistrel Taurus
Pipistrel Taurus G4
Pipistrel Taurus Electro
Pipistrel Virus
Pipistrel Virus SW
Pipistrel WATTsUP
Pipistrel 801 eVTOL

Pitts
Pitts Special Miss Dayton
Pitts Special Li'l Monster
Pitts S1 Special
Pitts S1 Li'l Stinker 
Pitts S1
Pitts S2
Pitts Model 12 Macho Stinker

Pitcairn/Pitcairn-Cierva
Pitcairn PA-1 Fleetwing six-seat passenger and mail biplane 
Pitcairn PA-2 Sesquiwing biplane mailplne
Pitcairn PA-3 Orowing biplane mailplane
Pitcairn PA-4 Fleetwing II sport biplane
Pitcairn Mailwing biplane mail plane
Pitcairn PA-18 two-seat open-cockpit autogyro
Pitcairn PA-19 four-seat cabin autogyro
Pitcairn PAA-1/PA-20 two-seat open-cockpit autogyro
Pitcairn PCA-2/PA-21 2-seat open-cockpit autogyro

Platzer
Platzer Kiebitz
Platzer Motte

Poberezny
 Poberezny P-5 Pober Sport
 Poberezny Pober Acro Sport
 Poberezny Pober Little Audrey
 Poberezny P-9 Pober Pixie
 Poberezny Pober Super Ace

Pocino
 Pocino PJ.1A

Polikarpov
Polikarpov R-5 biplane airliner based on P-5
Polikarpov PM-1 cabin biplane airliner
Polikarpov P-Z biplane airliner based on R-Z
Polikarpov U-2 open-cockpit utility and agricultural biplane

Ponnier
Ponnier D.I
Ponnier D.III
Ponnier L.1

Porterfield Aircraft Corporation
Porterfield 35 two-seat high-wing cabin monoplane
Porterfield Collegiate two-seat high-wing cabin monoplane

Potez
Potez 29 single-engine biplane airliner
Potez 43 single-engine light utility/touring monoplane
Potez 56 twin-engine low-wing monoplane airliner
Potez 58 single-engine light utility/touring monoplane
Potez 60 two-seat parasol utility/trainer monoplane
Potez 62 twin-engine monoplane airliner
Potez 840 four-engine turboprop executive transport

Pottier
Pottier P.40
Pottier P.50 Bouvereuil
Pottier P.60 Minacro
Pottier P.70
Pottier P.80
Pottier P.100
Pottier P.105TS
Pottier P.110TS
Pottier P.130 Coccinelle
Pottier P.170S
Pottier P.180S
Pottier P.210S Coati
Pottier P.220S Koala
Pottier P.230S Panda
Pottier P.240S Saiga
Pottier P.250S Xerus
Pottier P.270S Amster

Poullin
Poullin J.5A
Poullin J.5B
Poullin JP.20 Globe Trotter
Poullin JP.30

Praga
Praga E.114 two-seat sports monoplane
Praga E-210 and 211 twin-engine light transport

PWS
PWS-21 single-engine 4-passenger monoplane airliner
PWS-24 single-engine 4-passenger monoplane airliner
PWS-54 single-engine 3-passenger monoplane airliner

PZL
PZL.4 trimotor monoplane airliner
PZL.5 two-seat open-cockpit sporting and training biplane
PZL.16 single-engine passenger monoplane
PZL.19 three-seat sports monoplane
PZL.26 three-seat sports monoplane
PZL.27 trimotor monoplane airliner and mailplane
PZL.44 Wicher twin-engine low wing monoplane airliner

PZL Mielec
PZL M-18 Dromader crop spraying/firefighter aircraft
PZL M-20 Mewa license-built Piper PA-34 Seneca
PZL M-28 Skytruck utility aircraft

PZL Świdnik
PZL Świdnik (Mil) Mi-2 twin turboshaft utility helicopter
PZL Kania twin turboshaft utility helicopter
PZL W-3 Sokół twin-engine utility helicopter
PZL SW-4 Puszczyk utility helicopter

PZL Warszawa-Okęcie
PZL-101 Gawron four-seat utility aircraft
PZL-102 Kos two-seat touring and training monoplane
PZL-104 Wilga four-seat utility aircraft
PZL-105 Flaming single-engine 6-seat high-wing monoplane utility aircraft
PZL-106 Kruk low-wing monoplane cropduster monoplane
PZL-110 Koliber four-seat light aircraft based on MS.880
PZL-112 Junior two-seat flying club trainer

Q

Quest Aircraft
Quest Kodiak turboprop utility monoplane

Questair
Questair Venture two-seat sporting monoplane

Quicksilver Manufacturing
Quicksilver GT400 single seat high-wing pusher kitplane ultralight
Quicksilver GT500 two-seat high-wing pusher kitplane ultralight

Quickie
QAC Quickie single-seat tandem wing sports aircraft
QAC Quickie Q2 & Q200 two-seat tandem wing sports aircraft
Quickie Free Enterprise high wing monoplane for around the world flight attempt

R

Raab-Katzenstein
Raab-Katzenstein RK.9 Grasmücke two-seat touring biplane
Raab-Katzenstein RK.25 two-seat touring monoplane
Raab-Katzenstein RK-26 two-seat trainer and aerobatic biplane

Rafaelyants
Rafaelyants PR-5 single-engine cabin biplane developed from Polikarpov R-5
Rafaelyants PR-12 cabin monoplane developed from Polikarpov R-5
Rafaelyants RAF-1 single-seat low-wing sporting monoplane
Rafaelyants RAF-2two-seat  low-wing sporting monoplane
Rafaelyants RAF-11twin-engine low-wing monoplane airliner

Rans
Rans S-4 and S-5 Coyote single-seat high-wing monoplanes
Rans S-6 Coyote II two-seat high-wing monoplane
Rans S-7 Courier tandem two-seat high-wing monoplane
Rans S-9 Chaos single-seat mid-wing monoplane
Rans S-10 Sakota two-seat mid-wing monoplane
Rans S-11 Pursuit single-seat low-wing monoplane
Rans S-12 and S-14 Airaile, S-17 Stinger and S-18 1 or 2-seat pusher high-wing monoplane ultralights
Rans S-16 Shekari two-seat low-wing aerobatic monoplane
Rans S-19 Venterra two-seat low-wing monoplane
Rans S-20 Raven two-seat high-wing monoplane

Rawdon Brothers
Rawdon T-1 two-seat low-wing utility monoplane

Raytheon
Raytheon 390 Premier I light corporate jet
Beechcraft 1900 regional airliner and corporate transport
Raytheon Beechcraft Baron four or six-place twin-engine utility transport
Raytheon Beechcraft Bonanza four- to six-seat light aircraft
Raytheon Beechcraft King Air 200 twin turboprop utility transport
Raytheon Beechcraft King Air 300 & 350 turboprop utility aircraft
Raytheon Beechcraft King Air 90 & 100 twin turboprop utility transport
Raytheon Hawker 400XP (formerly Beechjet 400) light corporate jet
Raytheon Hawker 800 (formerly BAe 125) mid-size corporate jet
Raytheon Hawker 1000 mid-size corporate jet
Raytheon Hawker 4000 mid-size corporate jet

RBVZ (Russo Baltic Wagon Works)

Sikorsky Russky Vityaz four-engine biplane airliner

Rearwin
Rearwin Ken-Royce three-seat open-cockpit biplane
Rearwin Junior small high-wing monoplane
Rearwin Speedster high-wing enclosed cabin monoplane
Rearwin Cloudster high-wing enclosed cabin monoplane
Rearwin Sportster high-wing enclosed cabin monoplane
Rearwin Skyranger high-wing enclosed cabin monoplane

Renard
Renard R.17 single-engine cabin monoplane for flower delivery
Renard R.30 four-passenger trimotor airliner
Renard R.35 pressurized trimotor airliner

Reims
(licence built Cessna)
Reims F150 Cessna 150
Reims F152 Cessna 152
Reims F172 Cessna 172
Reims F177 Cessna 177
Reims F182 Cessna 182
Reims F337 Cessna 337
Reims-Cessna F406 Cessna 406

Republic
Republic RC-3 Seabee Four-seat amphibious light aircraft

RFB
Rhein Flugzeugbau RW 3 Multoplan two-seat pusher monoplane

Robin
Robin DR100 low-wing monoplane light aircraft
Robin DR200 low-wing monoplane light aircraft
Robin DR400 low-wing monoplane light aircraft
Robin DR500 low-wing monoplane light aircraft
Robin R2000two-seat training and aerobatic light aircraft
Robin HR200 two-seat training and aerobatic light aircraft
Robin R3000 two/four-seat light aircraft
Robin Aiglon four-seat light aircraft

Robinson/Redwing
Robinson Redwing two-seat single-engined biplane

Robinson Helicopter
Robinson R22 two-seat piston-engined light helicopter
Robinson R44 four-seat piston-engined light helicopter
Robinson R66 four-seat turbine light helicopter

Rockwell
Rockwell 500/520/560/680/685/720 Commander twin-engine utility transports
Commander 112, 114 and Commander Premier 115 four-seat light aircraft
Rockwell Sabreliner corporate jet

Rohrbach
Rohrbach Rocco twin-engine monoplane flying boat airliner
Rohrbach Roland trimotor monoplane airliner
Rohrbach Romar trimotor monoplane flying boat airliner
Rohrbach Rostra twin-engine monoplane mailplane flying boat

Rotorway
RotorWay Exec two-seat kit helicopter
RotorWay Scorpion homebuilt helicopter

Rumpler
Rumpler 5A 2 converted reconnaissance biplane used for mail and passengers

Ruschmeyer
Ruschmeyer R 90 four-seat light aircraft

Rutan
(see also Scaled Composites)
Rutan VariViggen two-seat canard pusher
Rutan VariEze two-seat canard pusher
Rutan Defiant four-seat twin-engine cabin pusher
Rutan Quickie single-seat tandem-wing aircraft
Rutan Long-EZ two-seat canard pusher
Rutan Voyager made non-stop unrefueled circumnavigation
Rutan Solitaire canard sailplane

RWD
RWD 1, 2, 3, 4 and 7 two-seat open-cockpit sports monoplanes
RWD 5 two-seat cabin sports monoplane
RWD 6 two-seat cabin sports monoplane
RWD 8 two-seat open-cockpit parasol monoplane trainer
RWD 9 two-seat cabin sports monoplane
RWD 10 single-seat open-cockpit aerobatics monoplane
RWD 11 twin-engine monoplane airliner
RWD 13 three-seat cabin sports monoplane
RWD 15 5-seat cabin sports monoplane
RWD 16 two-seat low-wing sports monoplane
RWD 17 two-seat open-cockpit aerobatics and training monoplane
RWD-19 two-seat low-wing sports monoplane
RWD 21 two-seat low-wing touring and sports monoplane

Ryan
Ryan M-1 & M-2 single-engine monoplane mailplane
Ryan Brougham single-engine monoplane airliner
Ryan NYP "Spirit of St. Louis" long-distance flight record aircraft
Ryan Foursome four-seat cabin monoplane
Ryan ST "Sports-Trainer" single-engine two-seat monoplane
Ryan S-C "Sports-Coupe" single-engine cabin monoplane
Ryan Navion single-engine four-seat cabin monoplane

S

Saab
Saab 90 Scandia twin-engined airliner
Saab 91 Safir single-engine trainer
Saab 340 twin turboprop regional airliner
Saab 2000 twin turboprop regional airliner

SABCA
SABCA S.2 4-seat single-engine monoplane airliner
SABCA S.11 trimotor monoplane airliner
SABCA S.12 trimotor monoplane airliner
SABCA S.30 parasol-wing ultralight

Sablatnig
Sablatnig P.I biplane airliner converted from bomber
Sablatnig P.III single-engine high-wing monoplane airliner

Sadler
Sadler Vampire two-seat light-sport aircraft

Salmson
Salmson 2 single-engine biplane mailplane converted from reconnaissance aircraft
Salmson Phrygane, Phryganet & Phrygane Major 2 or 3-seat cabin monoplane
Salmson Cri-Cri & Cri-Cri Major 2-seat open-cockpit parasol monoplane

Saunders (Canada)
Saunders ST-27 twin-engine feederliner
Saunders ST-28 twin-engine feederliner

Saunders-Roe/Saro (UK)
Saro Cutty Sark twin-engine utility/training amphibious flying boat
Saro Cloud twin-engine amphibious flying boat airliner
Saro Windhover trimotor amphibious flying boat airliner
Saunders-Roe Princess ten-engine flying boat airliner - largest all-metal flying boat ever built

Savoia-Marchetti
(see also SIAI-Marchetti)
Savoia-Marchetti S.55 twin-engine monoplane flying boat utility transport
Savoia-Marchetti S.56 single-engine sport biplane
Savoia-Marchetti S.66 trimotor flying boat airliner
Savoia-Marchetti S.71 trimotor monoplane airliner
Savoia-Marchetti S.73 trimotor monoplane airliner
Savoia-Marchetti S.74 4-engine monoplane airliner
Savoia-Marchetti SM.75 Marsupiale trimotor airliner
Savoia-Marchetti SM.80 2-seat utility/sports amphibian
Savoia-Marchetti SM.83 trimotor monoplane airliner
Savoia-Marchetti SM.84 twin-engine monoplane airliner, designation reused for unrelated bomber
Savoia-Marchetti SM.87 floatplane trimotor monoplane airliner
Savoia-Marchetti SM.95 four-engine monoplane airliner
Savoia-Marchetti SM.102 twin-engine airliner

Scaled Composites
(see also Rutan)
Scaled Composites White Knight experimental high-altitude jet to carry & launch SpaceShipOne
Scaled Composites SpaceShipOne experimental spaceplane

Scheibe
Scheibe Bergfalke two-seat mid-wing sailplane
Scheibe Spatz competition sailplane
Scheibe Zugvogel single-seat sailplane
Scheibe SF-23 Sperling two-seat high-wing cabin monoplane
Scheibe SF-24 Motor Spatz single-seat motor glider
Scheibe SF-25 Falke two-seat motor glider
Scheibe SF-26
Scheibe SF-27 single-seat sailplane
Scheibe SF-28 Tandem Falke two-seat motor glider
Scheibe SF-34 two-seat sailplane
Scheibe SF-36 two-seat motor glider
Scheibe SF 40 two-seat ultralight

Schempp-Hirth
Göppingen Gö 1 Wolf I single-seat sailplane
Göppingen Gö 3 Minimoa single-seat sailplane
Göppingen Gö 4 training sailplane
Göppingen Gö 5 single-seat training glider
Schempp-Hirth Standard Austria aerobatic sailplane
Schempp-Hirth Cirrus competition sailplane
Schempp-Hirth Standard Cirrus competition sailplane
Schempp-Hirth Discus competition sailplane
Schempp-Hirth Discus-2 competition sailplane
Schempp-Hirth Ventus competition sailplane
Schempp-Hirth Ventus-2 competition sailplane
Schempp-Hirth Nimbus competition sailplane
Schempp-Hirth Nimbus-2 competition sailplane
Schempp-Hirth Nimbus-3 single-seat competition sailplane
Schempp-Hirth Nimbus-4 competition self-launching sailplane
Schempp-Hirth Mini-Nimbus competition sailplane
Schempp-Hirth Janus two-seat competition sailplane
Schempp-Hirth Duo Discus two-seat competition sailplane

Schleicher
Schleicher Luftkurort Poppenhausen primary training glider
Schleicher Ka 2 Rhönschwalbe training glider
Schleicher Ka 3 single-seat training glider
Schleicher Ka-4 Rhönlerche II training glider
Schleicher Ka 6 single-seat glider
Schleicher K7 Rhönadler two-seat glider
Schleicher K 8 single-seat homebuilt glider
Schleicher ASW 12 competition sailplane
Schleicher ASK 13 training glider
Schleicher ASK 14 single-seat motor glider
Schleicher ASW 15 competition sailplane
Schleicher ASK 16 two-seat motor glider
Schleicher ASW 17 competition sailplane
Schleicher ASK 18 single-seat training sailplane
Schleicher ASW 19 competition sailplane
Schleicher ASW 20 competition sailplane
Schleicher ASK 21 training glider
Schleicher ASW 22 competition sailplane
Schleicher ASK 23 competition sailplane
Schleicher ASW 24 competition sailplane
Schleicher ASH 25 two-seat competition sailplane
Schleicher ASH 26 competition sailplane
Schleicher ASW 27 competition sailplane
Schleicher ASW 28 competition sailplane
Schleicher ASG 29 competition sailplane

Schneider (Australia)
Schneider ES-52 Kookaburra training sailplane
Schneider ES-59 Arrow competition sailplane
Schneider ES-65 Platypus training glider

Schweizer
Schweizer SGS 1-23 competition sailplane
Schweizer SGS 1-26 competition sailplane
Schweizer SGS 2-32 two-seat training and competition sailplane
Schweizer SGS 2-33 two-seat training glider
Schweizer Ag Cat biplane crop duster built under licence from Grumman
Schweizer 300 light utility helicopter
Schweizer 330 light turbine utility helicopter

Scottish Aviation
Scottish Aviation Jetstream turboprop regional airliner
Scottish Aviation Twin Pioneer utility transport

Seversky
Seversky AP-7 racing monoplane

Shanghai/Shaanxi
Shaanxi Y-5 Chinese development of Antonov An-2
Shaanxi Y-7 Chinese development of Antonov An-24
Shaanxi Y-8 Chinese development of Antonov An-12
Shaanxi Y-10 cancelled four-engine airliner
Shaanxi Y-12 twin-engine light transport

Shavrov
Shavrov Sh-2 single-engine utility monoplane amphibious flying boat

Short Brothers
Short L.17 Scylla 4-engine biplane airliner
Short S.8 Calcutta trimotor biplane airliner flying boat
Short S.16 Scion twin-engine monoplane airliner
Short S.17 Kent 4-engine biplane airliner flying boat
Short S.22 Scion Senior 4-engine monoplane airliner
Short Belfast Heavy lift turboprop freighter
Short Empire 4-engine monoplane airliner flying boat
Short Hythe 4-engine monoplane airliner flying boat
Short Mayo Composite piggy-back long-range seaplane/flying boat mailplane combination
Short Sandringham 4-engine monoplane airliner flying boat
Short Sealand twin-engine monoplane airliner amphibious flying boat
Short Skyvan & Skyliner utility transport
Short Solent 4-engine monoplane airliner flying boat
Short 330 Regional airliner and utility freighter
Short 360 regional airliner

SIAI-Marchetti
(for earlier designs see Savoia-Marchetti)
SIAI-Marchetti S.205 four-seat light airplane
SIAI-Marchetti S.208 four-seat light airplane
SIAI-Marchetti S.210 twin-engine 6-seat cabin monoplane
SIAI-Marchetti FN.333 Riviera four-seat amphibian

Siebel
Siebel Fh 104 twin-engine transport
Siebel Si 201
Siebel Si 202 two-seat monoplane sportsplane
Siebel Si 204 twin-engine transport

Sikorsky
(for earlier types see RBVZ)
Sikorsky S-36 twin-engine passenger amphibian
Sikorsky S-38 twin-engine passenger amphibian
Sikorsky S-39 single-engine passenger amphibian
Sikorsky S-40 4-engine airliner flying boat
Sikorsky S-42 4-engine airliner flying boat
Sikorsky S-43 twin-engine airliner amphibious flying boat
Sikorsky VS-44 four-engine airliner flying boat
Sikorsky S-51 light utility helicopter
Sikorsky S-55 utility helicopter
Sikorsky S-58 utility helicopter
Sikorsky S-61L & S61N utility helicopter
Sikorsky S-62 utility helicopter
Sikorsky S-64 Skycrane heavy lift helicopter
Sikorsky S-76 utility helicopter
Sikorsky S-92 helibus airliner and utility helicopter

Sino Swearingen
Sino Swearingen SJ30-2 Light corporate jet

SIPA (Société Industrielle Pour l'Aéronautique)
SIPA S.50
SIPA S.70 twin-engine airliner
SIPA S.90 two-seat touring monoplane
SIPA S.200 Minijet two-seat light jet
SIPA Antilope 4 or 5-seat turboprop cabin touring monoplane
SIPA Anjou four-seat twin-engine cabin utility monoplane
SIPA Coccinelle two-seat civil utility monoplane

Skandinavisk Aero Industri (SAI)
SAI KZ Isingle-seat low-wing sport monoplane
SAI KZ II two-seat low-wing sport monoplane
SAI KZ IIItwo-seat high-wing utility monoplane
SAI KZ IV twin-engine light transport and flying ambulance
SAI KZ VII Lærke four-seat high-wing utility cabin monoplane
SAI KZ VIII single-seat low-wing aerobatic monoplane

Slick Aircraft Company
Slick Aircraft Slick 360 single-seat aerobatics aircraft

Sling Aircraft
Sling Aircraft Sling 2 two-seat light sport aircraft
Sling Aircraft Sling 4 four-seat light sport aircraft

Slingsby
Slingsby T-67 Firefly two-seat basic trainer

SNCAC/Aérocentre (Société Nationale de Constructions Aéronautiques du Centre)
SNCAC NC.700 Martinet Siebel Si 204 twin-engine transport
SNCAC NC.840 Chardonneret four-seat cabin monoplane
SNCAC NC.850 Norvigie two or four-seat cabin monoplane
SNCAC NC.860 twin-engine four-seat cabin monoplane

SNCAN/Nord (Société Nationale de Constructions Aéronautiques du Nord)
Nord N 262 turboprop airliner
Nord 1200 Norécrin 2-4-seat cabin monoplane
Nord 1300 Grunau Baby training glider
Nord-2000 DFS Olympia Meise sailplane
Nord Noratlas twin-engine cargo transport

SNCASE/Sud-Est (Société Nationale de Constructions Aéronautiques du Sud Est)
SNCASE SE-161 Languedoc four-engine airliner
SNCASE SE-200 Amphitrite six-engine flying boat airliner
SNCASE SE-210 Caravelle twin jet airliner
SNCASE SE-2010 Armagnac four-engine airliner
SNCASE SE-2100 tailless pusher touring monoplane
SNCASE SE-2300 small touring cabin monoplane
SNCASE SE-3130 Alouette II utility helicopter
SNCASE SE-3160 Alouette III utility helicopter

SNCASO/Sud-Ouest (Société Nationale de Constructions Aéronautiques du Sud-Ouest)
SNCASO SO.30 Bretagne twin-engine airliner
SNCASO SO.80 Biarritz, SO.90 Cassiopée, SO.93 Corse, S.O.94 Corse II twin-engine airliner and mailplane
SNCASO SO.3050 two-seat cabin monoplane
SNCASO SO.7010 Pégase single-engine utility /executive transport
SNCASO SO.7060 Deauville light cabin monoplane

Snow
Snow S-1 and S-2 crop dusters

SOCATA
(for earlier types see Morane-Saulnier)
SOCATA GY-80 Horizon four-seat low-wing monoplane light aircraft
SOCATA ST 10 Diplomate four-seat low-wing monoplane light aircraft
SOCATA Rallye two/four-seat light aircraft
SOCATA TB Tampico, Tobago and Trinidad four/five-seat light aircraft
SOCATA TBM single-engine corporate turboprop

Sonaca
Sonaca 200 two-seat low-wing monoplane

Sopwith
Sopwith Antelope three-seat airliner & transport
Sopwith Atlantic transatlantic record aircraft
Sopwith DM (Daily Mail) Tractor Biplane single-engine racing floatplane biplane
Sopwith Dove two-seat sport biplane
Sopwith Gnu single-engine three-seat touring biplane
Sopwith Grasshopper two-seat open-cockpit touring biplane
Sopwith Rainbow racing floatplane biplane
Sopwith Schneider racing biplane
Sopwith Swallow parasol monoplane racer and utility aircraft
Sopwith Tabloid single-engine racing floatplane biplane
Sopwith Wallaby single-engine biplane airliner

SPCA (Société Provençale de Construction Aéronautique)
SPCA Météore 63 biplane airliner flying boat
SPCA VII/40T/41T/218 trimotor high-wing monoplane mailplane
SPCA 60T twin-engine passenger flying boat
SPCA 90/91T high-wing trimotor monoplane passenger and cargo transport

Spectrum
Spectrum Beaver one or two-seat pusher ultralight

Spartan Aircraft Company(US)
Spartan C2 two-seat light sport low-wing monoplane
Spartan C3 three-seat open-cockpit biplane
Spartan C4 single-engine high-wing cabin monoplane
Spartan C5 single-engine high-wing cabin monoplane
Spartan Executive single-engine luxury business monoplane

Spartan Aircraft (UK)
Simmonds Spartan two-seat single-engine open-cockpit biplane
Spartan Arrow two-seat single-engine open-cockpit biplane
Spartan Clipper single-engine two-seat cabin touring monoplane
Spartan Cruiser trimotor monoplane airliner
Spartan Three Seater single-engine open-cockpit biplane

St-Just
St-Just Cyclone improved homebuilt variant of the Cessna 180
St-Just Super-Cyclone improved homebuilt variant of the Cessna 180

St. Louis
St. Louis C2 Cardinal, Senior Cardinal & Super Cardinal two-seat high-wing cabin monoplane

Stampe et Vertongen
Stampe et Vertongen RSV.26/100, RSV.18/100, RSV.26/18, and SV.18 open-cockpit two-seat touring 

biplanes
Stampe et Vertongen RSV.32 open-cockpit two-seat training biplane
Stampe SV.4 open-cockpit two-seat aerobatics and training biplane

Standard
Standard J-1 utility/barnstorming biplane
Standard JR biplane mailplane

Star
Star Cavalier two-seat cabin monoplane

Starck
Starck AS-27 Starcky single-seat racing biplane
Starck AS-37 homebuilt two-seat biplane
Starck AS-57 two-seat low-wing monoplane sportsplane
Starck AS-70 Jac two-seat low-wing monoplane homebuilt
Starck AS-80 Holiday two-seat high wing monoplane kitplane
Starck AS.90 New Look mid-wing sportplane

Stearman Aircraft
(absorbed by Boeing)
Stearman LT-1 single-engine biplane passenger and mail transport
Stearman M-2 Speedmail single-engine biplane single-engine mailplane
Stearman C2 single-engine utility/mail biplane
Stearman C3 single-engine utility/mail biplane 
Stearman 4 Junior Speedmail single-engine utility/mailplane biplane
Stearman 4 Speedmail biplane single-engine utility/mailplane
Stearman 4 Senior Speedmail single-engine utility/mailplane biplane 
Stearman 6 Cloudboy two-seat training and sport biplane
Stearman CAB-1 Coach single-engine cabin biplane passenger transport

Stemme
Stemme S6 and S8 two-seat touring motorglider
Stemme S10 self-launching sailplane
Stemme S12 two-seat touring motorglider

Stinson
Stinson SB-1 Detroiter single-engine cabin airliner biplane 
Stinson SM Detroiter single-engine cabin airliner monoplane 
Stinson Junior single-engine cabin monoplane airliner
Stinson SR Reliant single-engine high-wing cabin monoplane
Stinson Model O single-engine open-cockpit two-seat monoplane
Stinson SM-6000 Airliner high-wing monoplane trimotor airliner
Stinson Model T high-wing monoplane trimotor airliner
Stinson Model U high-wing monoplane trimotor airliner
Stinson Model A low-wing monoplane trimotor airliner
Stinson Voyager single-engine sportsplane
Stinson 108 single-engine sportsplane

Stits
Stits DS-1 Baby Bird monoplane designed to be world's smallest aircraft
Stits SA-2A Sky Baby biplane designed to be world's smallest aircraft
Stits SA-3A Playboy single-seat low-wing homebuilt monoplane
Stits SA-4A Executive three-seat low wig homebuilt monoplane
Stits SA-5 Flut-R-Bug mid-wing homebuilt monoplane
Stits SA-7 Sky-Coupe two-seat high-wing homebuilt monoplane
Stits SA-8 Skeeto single-seat parasol-wing ultralight
Stits SA-11A Playmate two-seat low-wing monoplane

Sukhoi
Sukhoi Su-26 aerobatic aircraft
Sukhoi Su-29 two-seat aerobatic aircraft
Sukhoi Su-31 single-seat aerobatic aircraft
Sukhoi Su-80 twin-turboprop STOL aircraft
Sukhoi Superjet 100twin-jet medium-range airliner

Supermarine
Supermarine Air Yacht trimotor flying boat
Supermarine Channel open-cockpit flying boat passenger biplane
Supermarine Sea Eagle amphibious biplane flying boat airliner
Supermarine Southampton flying boat, several used as airliners
Supermarine Sparrow two-seat ultralight
Supermarine Stranraer twin-engine flying boat airliner and utility transport 
Supermarine Swan twin-engine biplane flying boat airliner
Supermarine Walrus single-engine amphibious biplane used as whaling spotter and utility transport

Swallow
Swallow TP open-cockpit biplane sport/trainer

Swearingen
Swearingen Merlin twin-turboprop feederliner/executive transport
Swearingen Metro twin-turboprop feederliner
Swearingen SA-30/Swearingen-Jaffe SJ30 executive transport
Swearingen SX-300 two-seat cabin homebuilt

T

Tachikawa
Tachikawa Ki-54 twin-engine airliner

Tairov
Tairov OKO-1 single-engine monoplane airline

Tatra
Tatra T.101 two-seat sports and record monoplane

Taylorcraft
Taylor Cub two-seat parasol monoplane
Taylor J-2 two-seat high-wing cabin monoplane
Taylorcraft A two-seat high-wing cabin monoplane
Taylorcraft B two-seat cabin monoplane
Taylorcraft D two-seat cabin monoplane
Taylorcraft 20 Ranch Wagon, Zephyr 400, Topper and Seabird four-seat cabin monoplane
Taylorcraft F-21 two-seat cabin monoplane

Technoavia
Technoavia SM92 Finist STOL utility transport
Technoavia Rysachok Twin engine light utility aircraft

Tecnam
Tecnam P92 two-seat single-engine lightplane
Tecnam P2006T four-seat light twin
Tecnam P2012 Traveller light utility twin

Temco
Tempco Swift low-wing two-seat enclosed monoplane

The Airplane Factory
The Airplane Factory Sling 2 two-seat light sport aircraft

Thruxton
Thruxton Jackaroo four-seat passenger biplane modified from de Havilland Tiger Moth

Thurston
Thurston Teal two-seat amphibian

Tipsy/Avions Fairey
Avions Fairey Tipsy B two-seat open-cockpit monoplane
Tipsy Nipper aerobatic single-seat monoplane
Avions Fairey Tipsy S & S.2 single-seat monoplanes
Avions Fairey Junior single-seat open-cockpit monoplane
Avions Fairey Belfair two-seat cabin monoplane
Avions Fairey Tipsy M/Fairey Primer monoplane basic trainer

Tokyo Koku
Tokyo Koku Aiba-Tsubame three-seat airliner

Toyota
Toyota TA-1 prototype single-engine, 4-place aircraft

Transavia
Transavia Airtruk sesquiplane top dresser
Transavia Skyfarmer sesquiplane top dresser

Travel Air
Travel Air 1000 three-seat open-cockpit utility biplane
Travel Air 2000, 3000 and 4000 three-seat open-cockpit utility biplanes
Travel Air 5000 single-engine monoplane airliner
Travel Air 6000 single-engine monoplane airliner
Travel Air 4 three-seat open-cockpit utility biplanes
Travel Air 6B single-engine monoplane airliner
Travel Air 10 single-engine monoplane airliner
Travel Air 11 three-seat open-cockpit utility biplane
Travel Air 12 open-cockpit utility biplane
Travel Air 14 open-cockpit utility biplane

Tupolev
Tupolev ANT-3/PS-3 single-engine sesquiplane mailplane
Tupolev ANT-4/G-1 twin-engine transport monoplane
Tupolev ANT-7/PS-7 twin-engine transport monoplane
Tupolev ANT-9 trimotor monoplane airliner
Tupolev ANT-14 four-engine monoplane airliner
Tupolev ANT-20 "Maxim Gorky" largest landplane of the 1930s
Tupolev ANT-35/PS-35 twin-engine monoplane airliner
Tupolev Tu-104 twin-jet medium-range airliner
Tupolev Tu-110 four-jet airliner
Tupolev Tu-114 four-turboprop long-range airliner
Tupolev Tu-116  four-turboprop long-range airliner
Tupolev Tu-124 twin jet short-range airliner
Tupolev Tu-134 twin-jet short-range airliner
Tupolev Tu-144 supersonic airliner
Tupolev Tu-154 medium-range airliner
Tupolev Tu-204 and 214 twin jet long-range airliner
Tupolev Tu-334 abandoned airliner

U

Udet
Udet U 7 Kolibri single-seat parasol monoplane
Udet U 8 Limousine three-seat single-engine monoplane airliner
Udet U 11 Kondor four-engined monoplane airliner
Udet U 12 Flamingo two-seat aerobatic and training biplane

V

Van's
Van's RV-3 single-seat low-wing monoplane homebuilt
Van's RV-4 tandem two-seat low-wing monoplane homebuilt
Van's RV-6 two-seat side by side low-wing monoplane homebuilt
Van's RV-7 two-seat side by side low-wing monoplane homebuilt
Van's RV-8 tandem two-seat low-wing monoplane homebuilt
Van's RV-9 two-seat side by side low-wing nosewheel monoplane homebuilt
Van's RV-10 four-seat low-wing homebuilt
Van's RV-12 two-seat side by side low-wing nosewheel monoplane homebuilt
Van's RV-14 two-seat side by side low-wing nosewheel monoplane homebuilt

VEB Flugzeugwerke Dresden
Baade B-152 passenger jet airliner

Verville
Verville Air Coach single-engine cabin monoplane airliner

VFW-Fokker
VFW-Fokker 614 twin-engined jet feederliner

Vickers-Armstrongs
Vickers Type 170 Vanguard twin-engine biplane airliner
Vickers Vanguard turboprop airliner
Vickers VC.1 Viking twin-engine airliner
Vickers VC10 jet airliner
Vickers Vellore single-engine cargo biplane
Vickers Vellox twin engine biplane airliner
Vickers Viastra trimotor monoplane airliner
Vickers Viking single-engine flying boat
Vickers Vimy Commercial twin-engine biplane airliner
Vickers Vulcan single-engine biplane airliner
Vickers Viscount turboprop airliner and freighter

Victa
Victa Aircruiser four-seat light aircraft
Victa Airtourer two-seat light aircraft

VisionAire
VisionAire Vantage single-engine corporate jet

Voisin
Voisin 1907 biplane biplane sportsplane
Voisin Canard biplane pusher canard sportsplane

Volmer
Volmer Sport
Volmer VJ-21 Jaybird
Volmer VJ-22 Sportsman homebuilt two-seat homebuilt amphibian
Volmer VJ-24W SunFun pod and boom motor-glider ultralight

Vulcanair
Vulcanair SF.600 Cangurotwin-engine feederliner
Vulcanair VF600W Mission single-engine turboprop utility transport

Vultee
Vultee V-1 single-engine monoplane airliner

W

Weaver Aircraft Co and Waco
Waco 4 open cockpit biplane 
Waco 5 three-seat open biplane
Waco 6 three-seat open biplane
Waco 7 three-seat open biplane
Waco 9 open-cockpit three-seat sports biplane
Waco 10, GXE, ASO, ATO and similar open-cockpit three-seat sports biplane
Waco JYM and JWM Mailplanes open-cockpit single-seat mail biplanes
Waco KBA, IBA, PBA, RBA and UBA two-seat sports biplanes
Waco PLA and ULA Sportsman two-seat sports biplanes
Waco INF, KNF, and RNF open-cockpit three-seat sports biplane
Waco PCF and QCF open-cockpit three-seat sports biplane
Waco UBF open-cockpit three-seat sports biplane
Waco UMF and YMF open-cockpit three-seat sports biplane
Waco YPF-6, YPF-7, ZPF-6, ZPF-7 and UPF-7 open-cockpit three-seat sports biplane
Waco ODC, PDC and QDC cabin touring biplanes
Waco BEC, OEC and UEC cabin touring biplanes
Waco UIC cabin touring biplanes
Waco CJC and DJC cabin touring biplanes
Waco UKC and YKC cabin touring biplanes
Waco CJC-S and DJC-S cabin touring biplanes
Waco UKC-S, YKC-S and ZKC-S cabin touring biplanes
Waco UKS-6, VKS-7, YKS-6, ZKS-6, ZKS-7 and HKS-7 cabin touring biplanes
Waco YOC & UOC cabin touring biplanes
Waco CUC cabin touring biplanes
Waco AQC-6, DQC-6, EQC-6, VQC-6, YQC-6 and ZQC-6 cabin touring biplanes
Waco AGC-8, DGC-7, EGC-7, EGC-8, MGC-8, ZGC-7 and ZGC-8 cabin touring biplanes
Waco AVN & ZVN nosewhell cabin touring biplanes
Waco ARE, HRE & SRE cabin touring biplanes
Waco W Aristocraft pusher cabin monoplane

Wassmer
Wassmer Javelot I, II and Super Javelot competition sailplanes
Wassmer Squale, Squale Marfa and Espadon competition sailplanes
Wassmer Bijave two-seat training glider
Wassmer WA-40 Super IV Sancy, WA-41 Baladou and WA-4/21 Prestige 5-seat single-engine cabin monoplanes
Wassmer WA-50, 51 Pacific, 52 Europa, 53 and 54 Atlantic 5-seat single-engine cabin monoplanes
Wassmer WA-80 Piranha monoplane cabin lightplane
Wassmer D.120 Paris-Nice monoplane cabin lightplane

Weatherly
Weatherly 201 low-wing monoplane crop duster
Weatherly 620 low-wing monoplane crop duster

Wedell-Williams
Wedell-Williams Model 22, McRobertson racer and We-Will Jr. racing monoplanes
Wedell-Williams Model 44, We-Will, We-Winc & 44 Special racing monoplanes
Wedell-Williams Model 45 racing monoplane

Werkspoor
Werkspoor Jumbo single-engine biplane freighter

Westland
Westland Dragonfly small utility helicopter
Westland Gazelle utility helicopter
Westland Limousine I, II & III single-engine airliners
Westland Wessex utility helicopter
Westland Wessex and IV trimotor airliners
Westland Whirlwind helicopter
Westland Widgeon two-seat single-engine ultralight monoplane
Westland Widgeon utility helicopter
Westland Woodpigeon two-seat single-engine ultralight biplane

Wibault
Wibault 240 single-engine airliner floatplane
Wibault 280 trimotor monoplane airliner
Wibault 360 single-engine monoplane airliner

Widerøe
Widerøe/Honningstad C.5 Polar single-engine utility cabin monoplane

X

Xi'an
Xian MA60 twin-turboprop regional aircraft
Xian MA600 twin-turboprop regional aircraft
Xian MA700 twin-turboprop regional aircraft under development
Xian Y-7 twin-turboprop transport/passenger aircraft

Y

Yakovlev
Yakovlev AIR-1 and 2 two-seat sport and training biplane
Yakovlev AIR-3, 4 and 8 two-seat parasol monoplane
Yakovlev AIR-5 single-engine high-wing cabin monoplane
Yakovlev AIR-6 single-engine high-wing cabin utility monoplane
Yakovlev AIR-7 low-wing racing monoplane
Yakovlev AIR-9 two-seat low-wing touring monoplane
Yakovlev AIR-11 single-engine low-wing touring monoplane
Yakovlev AIR-12 low-wing racing monoplane
Yakovlev UT-1 single-seat aerobatic and training aircraft
Yakovlev UT-2 two-seat aerobatic and training aircraft
Yakovlev Yak-12 multirole four-seat high-wing cabin monoplane
Yakovlev Yak-18T four-seat light aircraft
Yakovlev Yak-40 trijet regional jet airliner
Yakovlev Yak-42 short-range airliner
Yakovlev Yak-50 single-seat aerobatic monoplane
Yakovlev Yak-52 two-seat training aircraft
Yakovlev Yak-54 single-seat aerobatic monoplane
Yakovlev Yak-55 single-seat aerobatic monoplane
Yakovlev Yak-58 pusher monoplane
Yakovlev Yak-112 light utility monoplane

Yeoman
Yeoman Cropmaster low-wing monoplane cropduster

Z

Zeppelin
Zeppelin-Staaken E-4/20 four-engine monoplane airliner

Zivko
Zivko Edge 540 aerobatic aircraft

Zlin
Zlín Z-26, 126, 226, and 326 Trener and Akrobat aerobatic and training monoplanes
Zlín Z 526 Akrobat aerobatic monoplane
Zlin Z-37 Čmelák low-wing monoplane cropduster
Zlín Z 42, Z 142 and Z 242 monoplane light aircraft
Zlín Z 43 and Z 143 monoplane light aircraft
Zlín Z-50 aerobatic monoplane

Zenith
Zenith Zodiac CH 601 light two-seat aircraft

Zenith
Zenith Z-6 single-engine biplane airliner and mailplane
Zenith Albatross Z-12 trimotor monoplane airliner

See also
List of aircraft
List of most-produced aircraft
List of ICAO aircraft type designators
List of airliners by maximum takeoff weight
List of Bushplanes
List of light transport aircraft
List of racing aircraft
List of regional airliners

References

Citations

Bibliography

Lists of aircraft by role